= 2nd federal electoral district of Tlaxcala =

Federal electoral district of Mexico

Tlaxcala's 2nd
- Electoral district of the Chamber of Deputies of Mexico

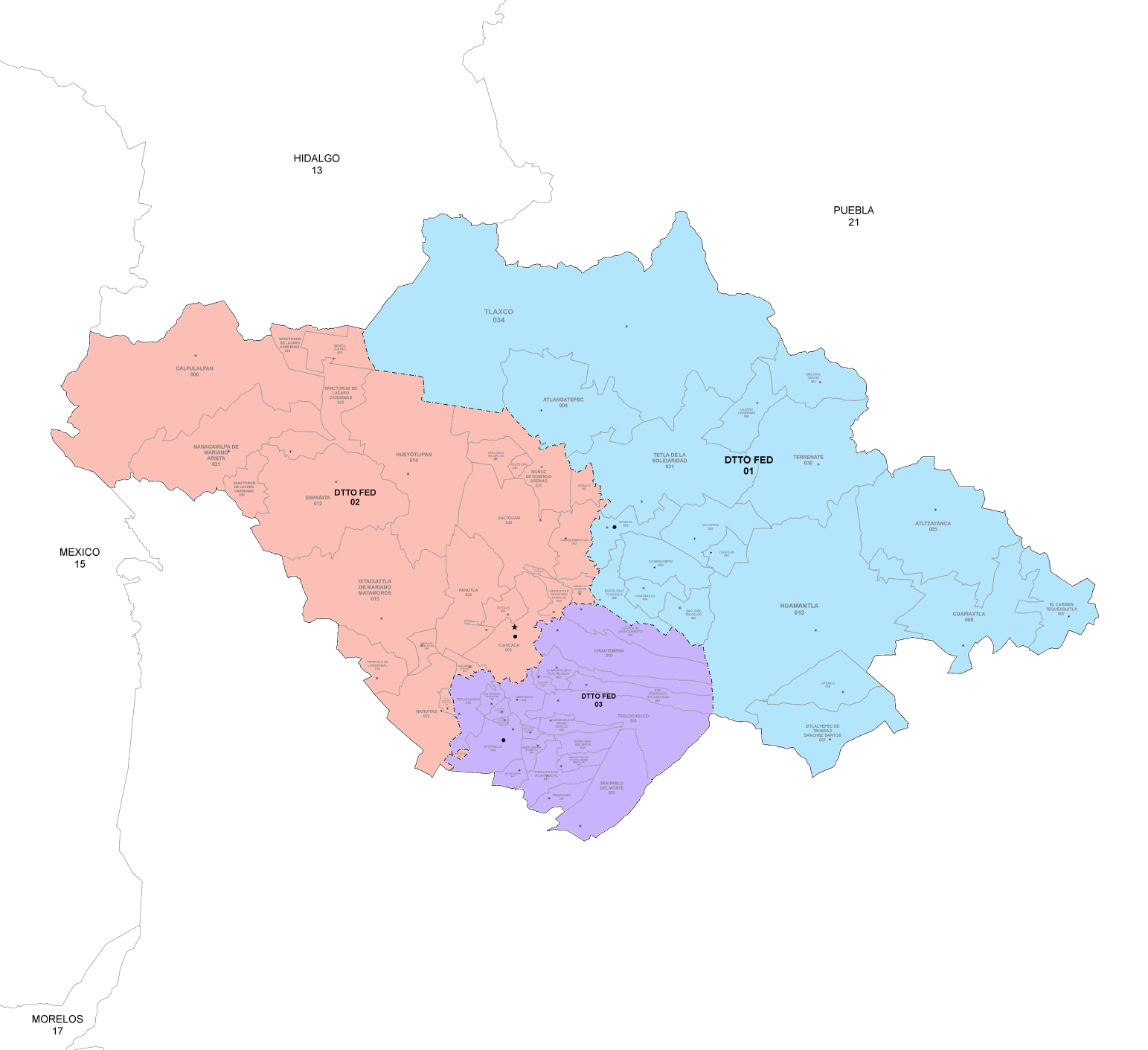
- 2nd district since 2023

Incumbent
- Member: Raymundo Vázquez Conchas
- Party: ▌Ecologist Green Party
- Congress: 66th (2024–2027)

District
- State: Tlaxcala
- Head town: Tlaxcala de Xicohténcatl
- Coordinates: 19°18′N 98°14′W
- Covers: 22 municipalities: Amaxac, Apetatitlán, Apizaco, Benito Juárez, Calpulalpan, Españita, Hueyotlipan, Ixtacuixtla, Muñoz, Nanacamilpa, Nativitas, Nopalucan, Panotla, Sanctórum, Teacalco, Tecopilco, Tepetitla, Texoloc, Tlaxcala, Totolac, Xaltocan, Yauhquemehcan
- PR region: Fourth
- Precincts: 225
- Population: 455,739 (2020 census)

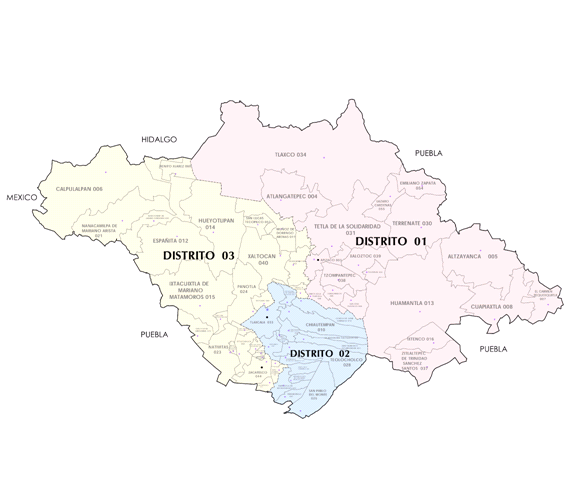
Tlaxcala under the 2017–2022 districting plan

The 2nd federal electoral district of Tlaxcala (Spanish: Distrito electoral federal 02 de Tlaxcala) is one of the 300 electoral districts into which Mexico is divided for elections to the federal Chamber of Deputies and one of three such districts in the state of Tlaxcala.

It elects one deputy to the lower house of Congress for each three-year legislative session by means of the first-past-the-post system. Votes cast in the district also count towards the calculation of proportional representation ("plurinominal") deputies elected from the fourth region.

The current member for the district, elected in the 2024 general election, is Raymundo Vázquez Conchas. Originally elected for the National Regeneration Movement (Morena), he switched to the Ecologist Green Party of Mexico on 1 September 2024.

== District territory ==
Under the 2023 districting plan adopted by the National Electoral Institute (INE), which is to be used for the 2024, 2027 and 2030 federal elections, Tlaxcala's 2nd covers 225 electoral precincts (secciones electorales) across the central and western portion of the state. It comprises 22 of the state's municipalities:

- Amaxac, Apetatitlán, Apizaco, Benito Juárez, Calpulalpan, Españita, Hueyotlipan, Ixtacuixtla, Muñoz, Nanacamilpa, Nativitas, Nopalucan, Panotla, Sanctórum, Teacalco, Tecopilco, Tepetitla, Texoloc, Tlaxcala, Totolac, Xaltocan and Yauhquemehcan.

The head town (cabecera distrital), where results from individual polling stations are gathered together and tallied, is the city of Tlaxcala de Xicohténcatl, the state capital. The district reported a population of 455,739 in the 2020 census.

== Previous districting schemes ==
Evolution of electoral district numbers
	1974	1978	1996	2005	2017	2023
Tlaxcala	2	2	3	3	3	3
Chamber of Deputies	196	300				

2017–2022

Under the 2017 districting scheme, Tlaxcala's 2nd covered 15 municipalities in the centre and west of the state. The state capital served as the head town.

== Deputies returned to Congress ==
(Mexico) National parties
- Current
- PAN
- PRI
- PT
- PVEM
- MC
- Morena
- PAZ
- Somos
- Defunct or local only
- PLM
- PNR
- PRM
- PNM
- PP
- PPS
- PARM
- PFCRN
- CON
- PANAL
- PSD
- PES
- PES
- PRD

Tlaxcala's 2nd district
Election	Deputy	Party	Term	Legislature
1916	Modesto González Galindo		1916–1917	Constituent Congress of Querétaro
...
1952	Emilio Sánchez Piedras	Institutional Revolutionary Party	1952–1955	42nd Congress
...
1970	María de los Ángeles Grant Munive	Institutional Revolutionary Party	1970–1973	48th Congress
1973	Aurelio Zamora García	Institutional Revolutionary Party	1973–1976	49th Congress
1976	Antonio Vega García	Institutional Revolutionary Party	1976–1979	50th Congress
1979	Beatriz Paredes Rangel	Institutional Revolutionary Party	1979–1982	51st Congress
1982	Alma Gracia de Zamora	Institutional Revolutionary Party	1982–1985	52nd Congress
1985	Samuel Quiroz de la Vega	Institutional Revolutionary Party	1985–1988	53rd Congress
1988	Jesús Pelecastre Rojas	Institutional Revolutionary Party	1988–1991	54th Congress
1991	Álvaro Salazar Lozano	Institutional Revolutionary Party	1991–1994	55th Congress
1994	Alfonso Sánchez Anaya	Institutional Revolutionary Party	1994–1997	56th Congress
1997	Enrique Padilla Sánchez	Institutional Revolutionary Party	1997–2000	57th Congress
2000	Héctor Ortiz Ortiz; Eréndira Cova Brindis	Institutional Revolutionary Party	2000–2001; 2001–2003	58th Congress
2003	Florentino Domínguez Ordóñez	Institutional Revolutionary Party	2003–2006	59th Congress
2006	Adolfo Escobar Jardínez (Note: Escobar Jardínez requested a leave of absence to contend for the mayoralty of Tlaxcala de Xicohténcatl; after failing to win that election, he returned to his seat.); María Ofelia Malcos Alfaro; Adolfo Escobar Jardínez (Note: Escobar Jardínez requested a leave of absence to serve as the General Secretary of Government of Tlaxcala.); María Ofelia Malcos Alfaro	National Action Party (Mexico)	2006–2007; 2007; 2007–2009; 2009	60th Congress
2009	Julián Velázquez Llorente	National Action Party (Mexico)	2009–2012	61st Congress
2012	Humberto Vega Vázquez	Party of the Democratic Revolution Labour Party (Mexico) Citizens' Movement (Mexico)	2012–2015	62nd Congress
2015	Anabel Alvarado Varela	Institutional Revolutionary Party	2015–2018	63rd Congress
2018	Rubén Terán Águila	National Regeneration Movement	2018–2021	64th Congress
2021	Irma Yordana Garay Loredo	Labour Party (Mexico)	2021–2024	65th Congress
2024	Raymundo Vázquez Conchas (Note: Originally elected for Morena, Vázquez Conchas switched to the Ecologist Green Party of Mexico on 1 September 2024.)	National Regeneration Movement Ecologist Green Party of Mexico	2024–2027	66th Congress

== Presidential elections ==
Tlaxcala's 2nd district
Election	District won by	Party or coalition	%
2018	Andrés Manuel López Obrador	Juntos Haremos Historia	73.6809
2024	Claudia Sheinbaum Pardo	Sigamos Haciendo Historia	67.3829
