= Tlaxcala Municipality =

Tlaxcala (municipality)
- Municipality
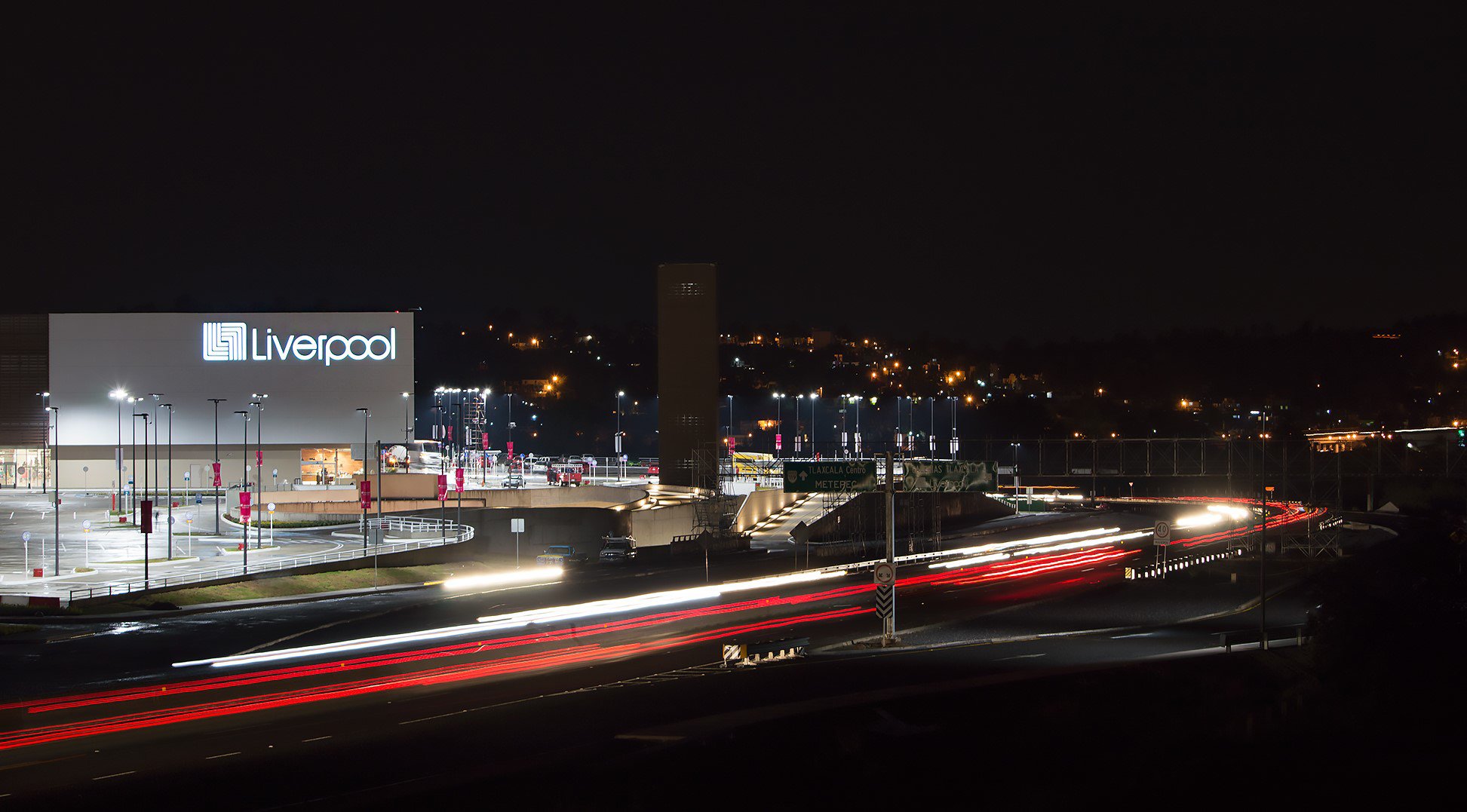
- Periférico de Tlaxcala

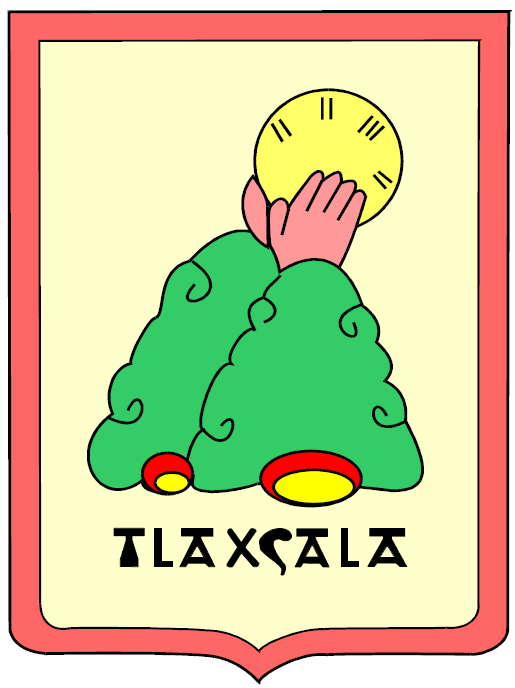
- Flag Coat of arms

- Location within Tlaxcala Location within Mexico
- Coordinates: 19.3167°N 98.2333°W
- Country: Mexico
- State: Tlaxcala
- Municipal seat: Tlaxcala de Xicohténcatl

Population (2020)
  - Total: 99,896
- Time zone: UTC-6 (Central)
- Website: capitaltlaxcala.gob.mx/

Tlaxcala is a municipality in the central Mexican state of Tlaxcala. The municipal seat is the city of Tlaxcala de Xicohténcatl, which also serves as the state capital.

== The municipality ==
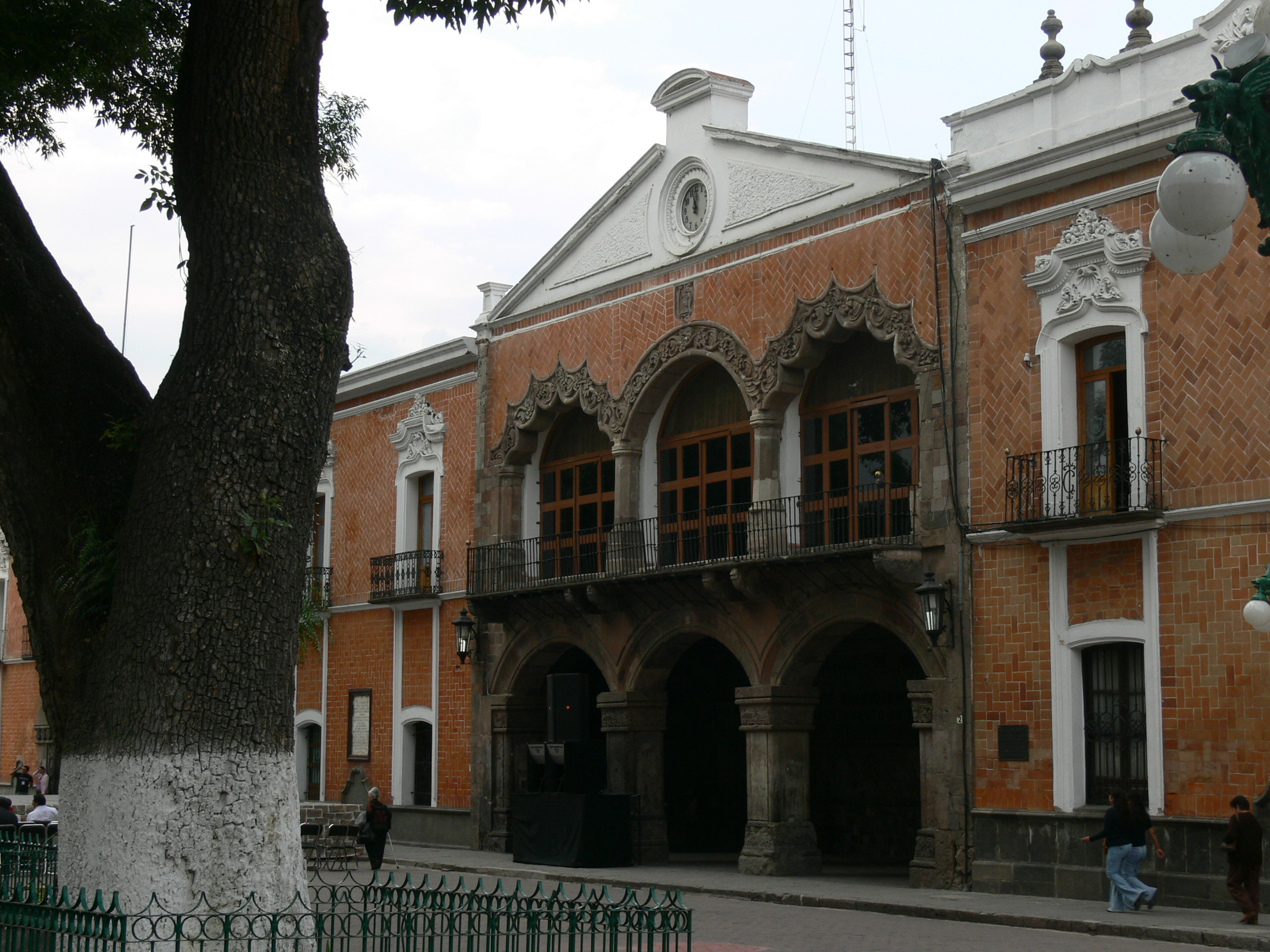
City Hall

The city is the governing authority for itself and fifteen other communities, forming a territory of 41.61 km^{2} (16.07 sq mi). It is located in the south of the state, where most of the population is concentrated. It borders the municipalities of Totolac, Apetatitlán de Antonio Carvajal, Tepeyanco, Tetlatlahuca, San Damián Texoloc, San Jerónimo Zacualpan, Chiautempan, La Magdalena Tlaltelulco, Santa Isabel Xiloxoxtla and Panotla. The municipal government consists of a municipal president, an officer called a síndico and seven representatives called regidores.

The municipality has a very low level of socioeconomic marginalization, with no community having a state of medium and high marginalization. There are 23,035 residences as of 2010.

Significant communities outside the municipal seat include Ocotlán, San Estebán Tizatlán, San Gabriel Cuauhtla, San Hipólito Chimalpa, San Lucas Cuauhtelupan and Santa Maria Acuitlapilco. The Sanctuary of Our Lady of Ocotlán was consecrated in 1854 and in 1905 it was declared the parish church of Ocotlán. In 1907, it was declared a collegiate church and in 1957, it became a minor basilica. The church is in Tlaxcalan Baroque style characterized by the use of tile and red brick. The façade is built to look like an altarpiece and topped with a seashell image. The main entrance is an arch flanked by estipite and Salomonic columns with have images of the doctors of the church, as well as the twelve Apostles. Saint Joseph appears in the arch. Above this is a figure representing the Immaculate Conception and Francis of Assisi. Near this is the choral window in the form of a stylized star. The towers were construction in the latter 18th century with arches and vegetative decoration. The cupola contains four mirrors with the cornice covered in gold leaf. The ante-sacristy has five oil paintings by Manuel Caro done in 1781 depicting scenes of some of the Virgin Mary's appearances. The sacristy has a painting of Saint Joseph by Joaquin Magón from 1754. The Guadalupe chapel to the side has lead figures of the Four Evangelists as well as paintings by Miguel Lucas Bedolla and Manuel Yañez. The image of the virgin is in a Baroque chamber decorated in plasterwork by Francisco Miguel Tlayoltehuanitzin between 1715 and 1740 and eight Salomonic columns.
