= Adolfo Escobar Jardínez =

Mexican politician

- Born: 26 October 1970 (age 55); Tlaxcala, Mexico
- Occupation: Politician
- Political party: PAN

Adolfo Escobar Jardínez (born 26 October 1970) is a Mexican politician from the National Action Party (PAN). From 2006 to 2009 he served as a deputy in the 60th Congress representing Tlaxcala's second district for the PAN.
