= Eréndira Cova Brindis =

Mexican politician

- Born: Tlaxcala, Mexico
- Occupation: Politician
- Political party: PRI

Eréndira Cova Brindis is a Mexican politician from the Institutional Revolutionary Party. From 2001 to 2003 she served as Deputy of the LVIII Legislature of the Mexican Congress representing Tlaxcala's second district.
