= Julián Velázquez y Llorente =

Mexican politician

- Born: 14 May 1944 (age 82); Mexico City Mexico
- Occupation: Politician
- Political party: PAN

Julián Francisco Velázquez y Llorente (born 14 May 1944) is a Mexican politician from the National Action Party (PAN). From 2009 to 2012 he served in the Chamber of Deputies during the 61st session of Congress, representing Tlaxcala's 2nd district.
