= Florentino Domínguez Ordóñez =

Mexican politician (1962–2020)

- Born: 16 October 1962; Chiautempan, Tlaxcala, Mexico
- Died: 27 December 2020 (aged 58)
- Occupation: Politician
- Political party: PRI

Florentino Domínguez Ordóñez (16 October 1962 – 27 December 2020) was a Mexican politician affiliated with the Institutional Revolutionary Party (PRI).

== Biography ==
In 2003–2006 he served as a deputy in the 59th Congress, representing Tlaxcala's second district.

Domínguez Ordóñez was Secretary of Public Education in Tlaxcala when he died from COVID-19 during the COVID-19 pandemic in Mexico, on 27 December 2020.
