= José Humberto Vega Vázquez =

Mexican politician

- Born: 3 November 1957 (age 68); Chiautempan, Tlaxcala, Mexico
- Occupation: Deputy
- Political party: PRD

José Humberto Vega Vázquez (born 3 November 1957) is a Mexican politician affiliated with the PRD. As of 2013 he served as Deputy of the LXII Legislature of the Mexican Congress representing Tlaxcala.
