= La Magdalena Tlaltelulco =

- Municipality
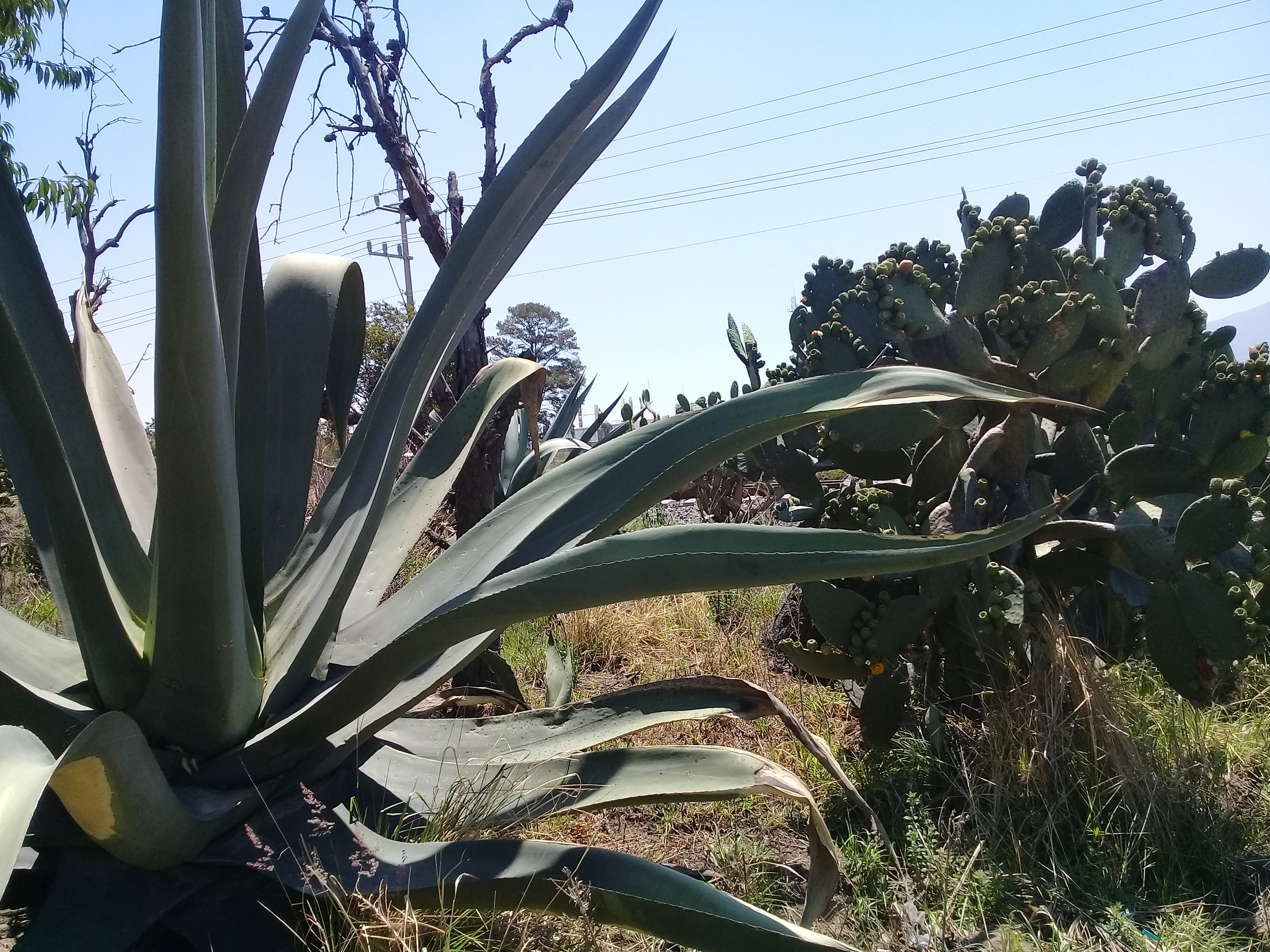

- Location within Tlaxcala Location within Mexico
- Coordinates: 19°16′0″N 98°12′0″W
- Country: Mexico
- State: Tlaxcala

Area
  - Total: 14.23 km^{2} (5.49 sq mi)
- Elevation: 2,320 m (7,610 ft)

Population (2005)
  - Total: 15,046
  - Density: 1,057/km^{2} (2,739/sq mi)
- Time zone: UTC-6 (Central)

La Magdalena Tlaltelulco is a town and its surrounding municipality in the Mexican state of Tlaxcala.
