= San Jerónimo Zacualpan =

- Municipality
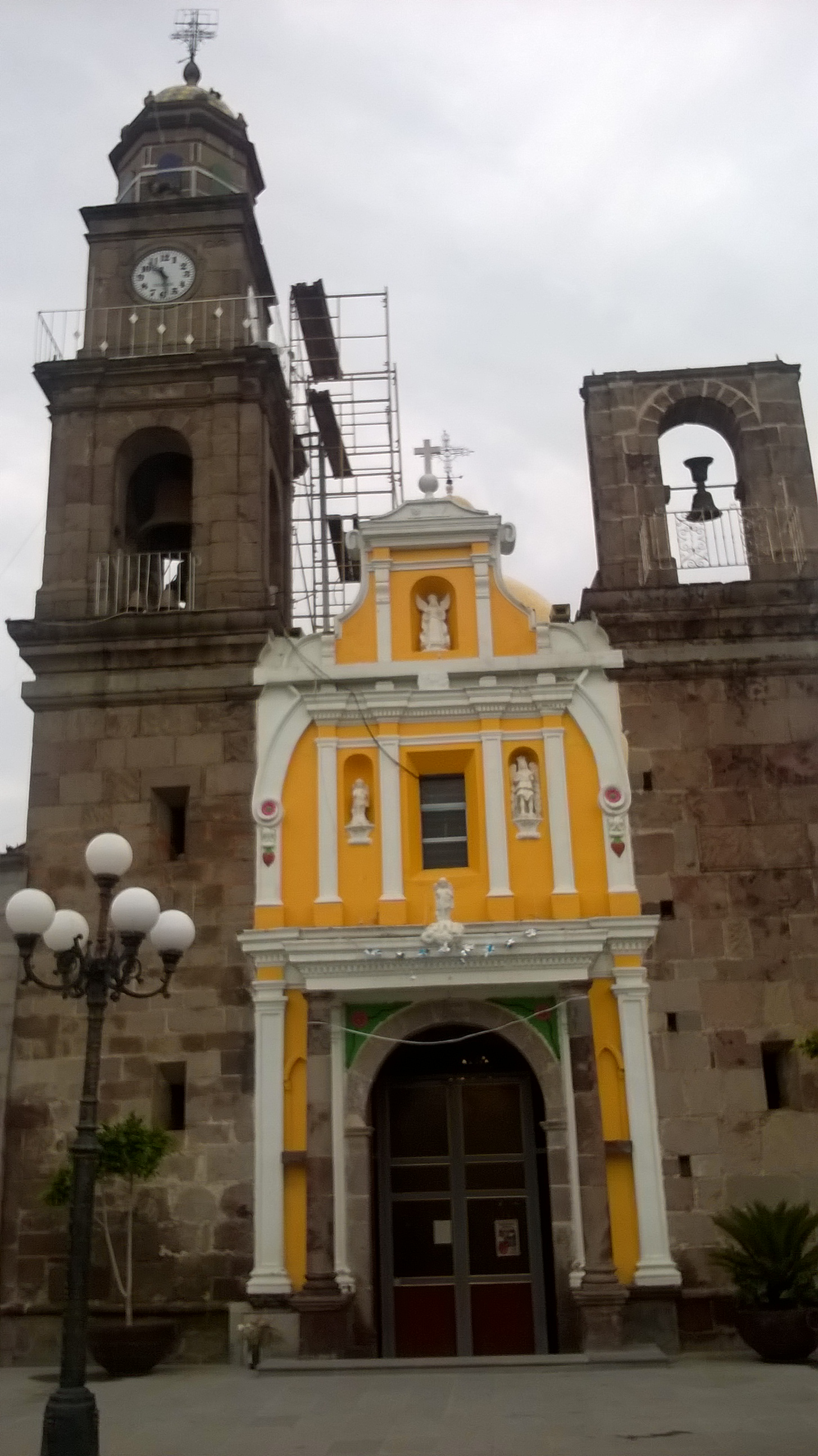
- Saint Jerome's Church

- Location within Tlaxcala Location within Mexico
- Coordinates: 19.2333°N 98.2667°W
- Country: Mexico
- State: Tlaxcala

Government
  - Mayor: Isidro Nophal García
- Time zone: UTC-6 (Central)

San Jerónimo Zacualpan is a town and its surrounding municipality in the Mexican state of Tlaxcala.
