= San Damián Texoloc =

- Municipality
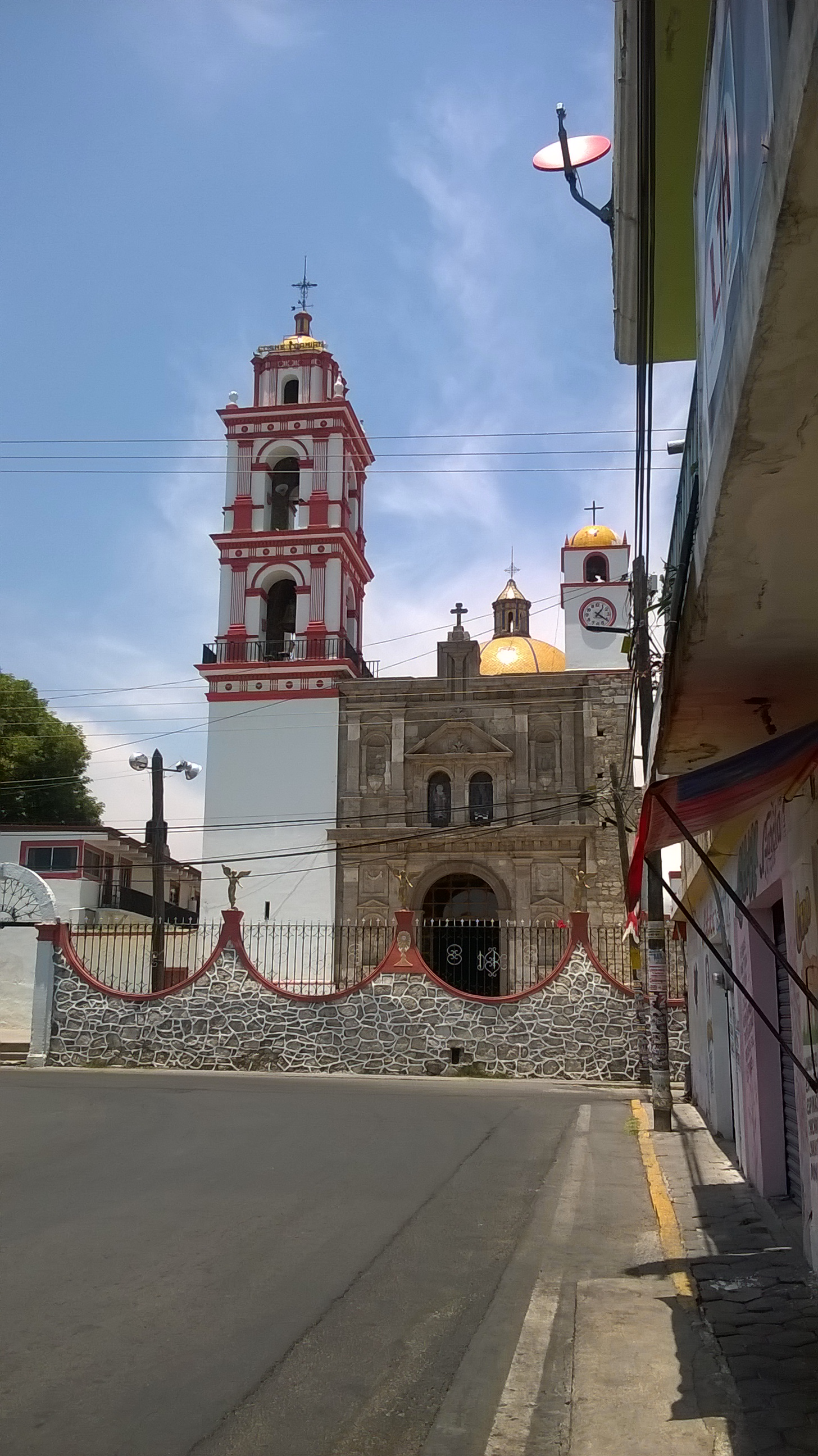
- San Damian's church

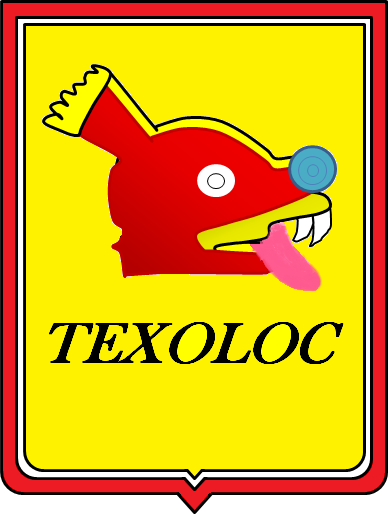
- Coat of arms

- Location within Tlaxcala Location within Mexico
- Coordinates: 19.2833°N 98.2833°W
- Country: Mexico
- State: Tlaxcala
- Time zone: UTC-6 (Central)

San Damián Texoloc is a town and its surrounding municipality in the Mexican state of Tlaxcala.
