= Totolac =

- Municipality
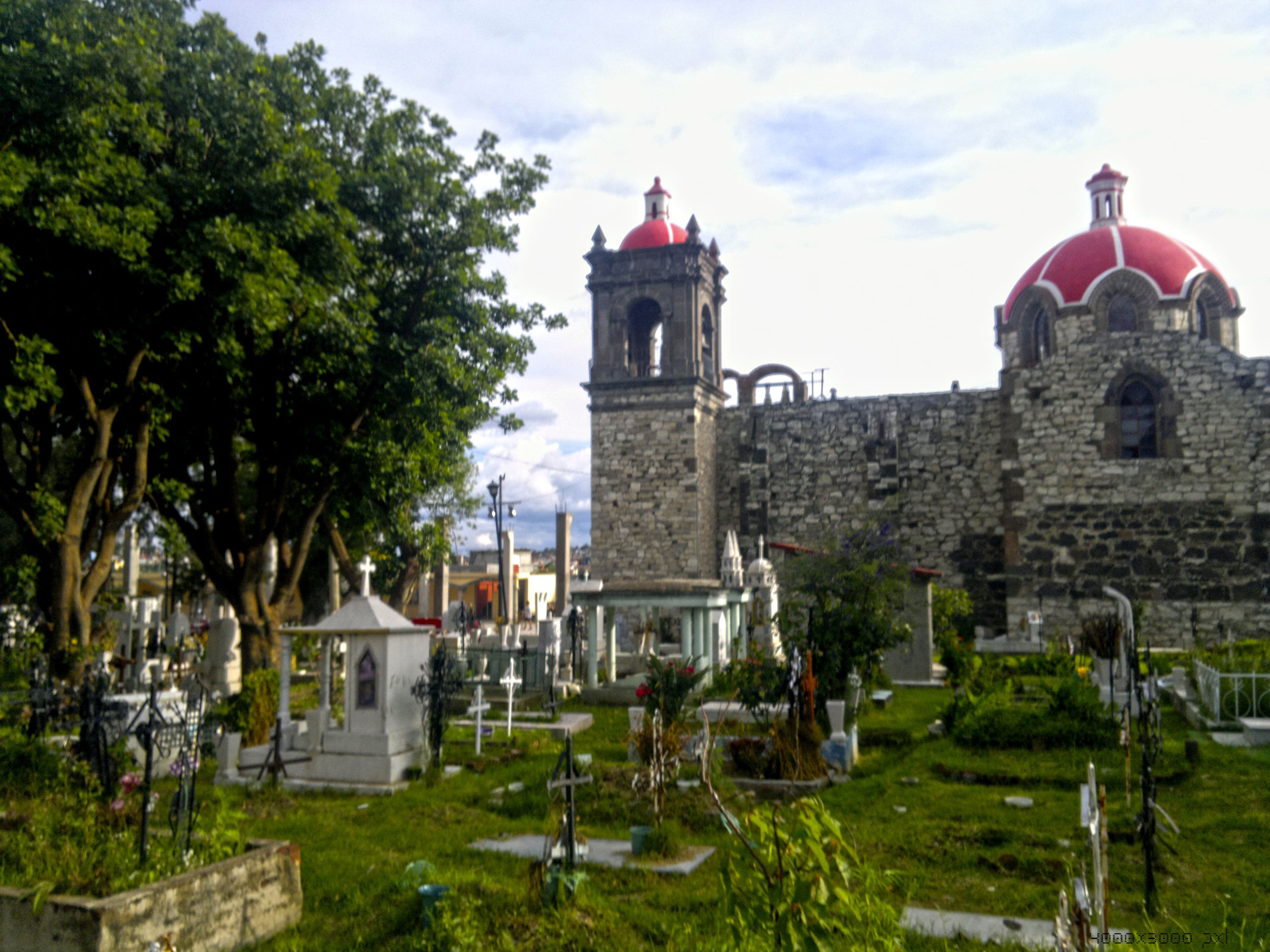

- Coat of arms

- Location within Tlaxcala Location within Mexico
- Coordinates: 19°19′N 98°15′W
- Country: Mexico
- State: Tlaxcala
- Municipal seat: San Juan Totolac
- Time zone: UTC-6 (Central)

Totolac is a municipality in the Mexican state of Tlaxcala. The municipal seat is known as San Juan Totolac.
