= 1st federal electoral district of Tlaxcala =

Federal electoral district of Mexico

Tlaxcala's 1st
- Electoral district of the Chamber of Deputies of Mexico

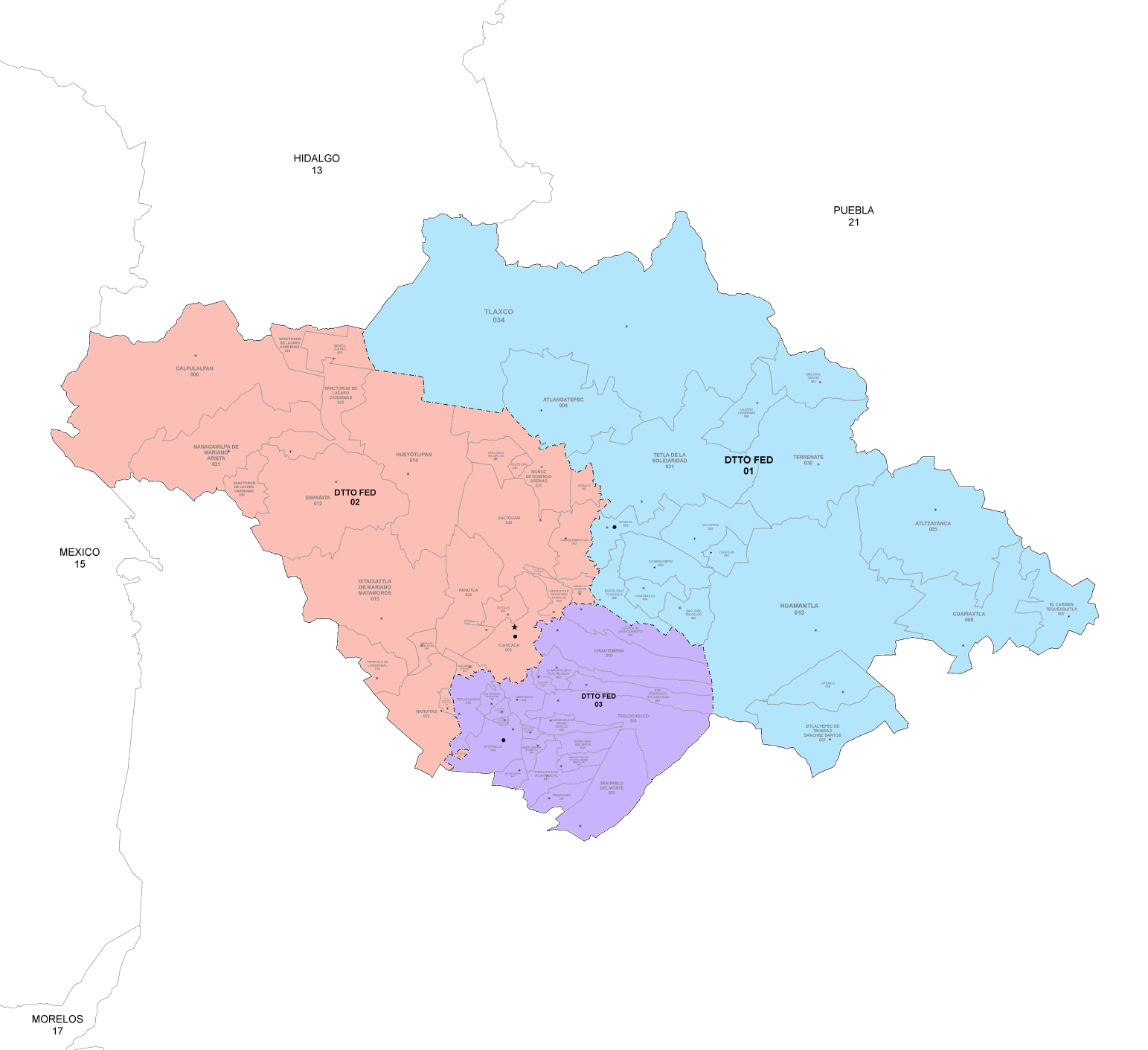
- 1st district since 2017

Incumbent
- Member: Alejandro Aguilar López
- Party: ▌Labour Party
- Congress: 66th (2024–2027)

District
- State: Tlaxcala
- Head town: Apizaco
- Coordinates: 19°25′N 98°08′W
- Covers: 19 municipalities: Altzayanca, Apizaco, Atlangatepec, Cuapiaxtla, Cuaxomulco, El Carmen Tequexquitla, Emiliano Zapata, Huamantla, Ixtenco, Lázaro Cárdenas, San José Teacalco, Santa Cruz Tlaxcala, Terrenate, Tetla de la Solidaridad, Tlaxco, Tocatlán, Tzompantepec, Xaloztoc, Zitlaltepec de Trinidad Sánchez Santos
- PR region: Fourth
- Precincts: 239
- Population: 446,499 (2020 census)

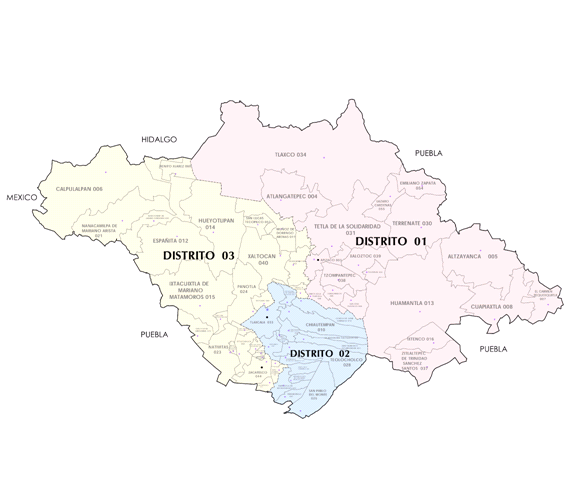
Tlaxcala under the 2017–2022 districting plan

The 1st federal electoral district of Tlaxcala (Spanish: Distrito electoral federal 01 de Tlaxcala) is one of the 300 electoral districts into which Mexico is divided for elections to the federal Chamber of Deputies and one of three such districts in the state of Tlaxcala.

It elects one deputy to the lower house of Congress for each three-year legislative session by means of the first-past-the-post system. Votes cast in the district also count towards the calculation of proportional representation ("plurinominal") deputies elected from the fourth region.

The current member for the district, re-elected in the 2024 general election, is Alejandro Aguilar López of the Labour Party (PT).

== District territory ==
Under the 2023 districting plan adopted by the National Electoral Institute (INE), which is to be used for the 2024, 2027 and 2030 federal elections, Tlaxcala's 1st comprises 239 electoral precincts (secciones electorales) across 19 of the state's municipalities:

- Altzayanca, Apizaco, Atlangatepec, Cuapiaxtla, Cuaxomulco, El Carmen Tequexquitla, Emiliano Zapata, Huamantla, Ixtenco, Lázaro Cárdenas, San José Teacalco, Santa Cruz Tlaxcala, Terrenate, Tetla de la Solidaridad, Tlaxco, Tocatlán, Tzompantepec, Xaloztoc and Zitlaltepec de Trinidad Sánchez Santos.

The head town (cabecera distrital), where results from individual polling stations are gathered together and tallied, is the city of Apizaco. The district reported a population of 446,499 in the 2020 census.

== Previous districting schemes ==
Evolution of electoral district numbers
	1974	1978	1996	2005	2017	2023
Tlaxcala	2	2	3	3	3	3
Chamber of Deputies	196	300				

2017–2022

No changes were made to the 1st district in the 2023 redistricting process; under the 2017 districting plan it therefore had the same configuration.

== Deputies returned to Congress ==
(Mexico) National parties
- Current
- PAN
- PRI
- PT
- PVEM
- MC
- Morena
- PAZ
- Somos
- Defunct or local only
- PLM
- PNR
- PRM
- PNM
- PP
- PPS
- PARM
- PFCRN
- CON
- PANAL
- PSD
- PES
- PES
- PRD

Tlaxcala's 1st district
Election	Deputy	Party	Term	Legislature
1916	Antonio Hidalgo Sandoval		1916–1917	Constituent Congress of Querétaro
...
1958	Emilio Sánchez Piedras	Institutional Revolutionary Party	1958–1961	44th Congress
1961	Anselmo Cervantes Hernández	Institutional Revolutionary Party	1961–1964	45th Congress
1964	Tulio Hernández Gómez	Institutional Revolutionary Party	1964–1967	46th Congress
1967	Nicolás López Galindo	Institutional Revolutionary Party	1967–1970	47th Congress
1970	José Dolores Díaz Flores	Institutional Revolutionary Party	1970–1973	48th Congress
1973	Esteban Minor Quiroz	Institutional Revolutionary Party	1973–1976	49th Congress
1976	Nazario Romero Díaz	Institutional Revolutionary Party	1976–1979	50th Congress
1979	Salvador Domínguez Sánchez	Institutional Revolutionary Party	1979–1982	51st Congress
1982	José Antonio Álvarez Lima	Institutional Revolutionary Party	1982–1985	52nd Congress
1985	Beatriz Paredes Rangel n/d	Institutional Revolutionary Party	1985–1986; 1986–1988	53rd Congress
1988	Félix Pérez Amador	Institutional Revolutionary Party	1988–1991	54th Congress
1991	Héctor Ortiz Ortiz	Institutional Revolutionary Party	1991–1994	55th Congress
1994	Joaquín Cisneros Fernández	Institutional Revolutionary Party	1994–1997	56th Congress
1997	José Pascual Grande Sánchez	Institutional Revolutionary Party	1997–2000	57th Congress
2000	Javier García González	Institutional Revolutionary Party	2000–2003	58th Congress
2003	Gelacio Montiel Fuentes	Party of the Democratic Revolution	2003–2006	59th Congress
2006	José Alejandro Aguilar López (Note: Aguilar López resigned his seat on 23 February 2009 to take office as Secretary of Economic Development of the Tlaxcala state government.); María Guadalupe Salazar Anaya	National Action Party (Mexico)	2006–2009; 2009	60th Congress
2009	Oralia López Hernández	National Action Party (Mexico)	2009–2012	61st Congress
2012	María Guadalupe Sánchez Santiago	Institutional Revolutionary Party	2012–2015	62nd Congress
2015	Rosalinda Muñoz Sánchez	Institutional Revolutionary Party	2015–2018	63rd Congress
2018	José de la Luz Sosa Salinas	National Regeneration Movement	2018–2021	64th Congress
2021	José Alejandro Aguilar López	Labour Party (Mexico)	2021–2024	65th Congress
2024	José Alejandro Aguilar López	Labour Party (Mexico)	2024–2027	66th Congress

== Presidential elections ==
Tlaxcala's 1st district
Election	District won by	Party or coalition	%
2018	Andrés Manuel López Obrador	Juntos Haremos Historia	63.9137
2024	Claudia Sheinbaum Pardo	Sigamos Haciendo Historia	67.5988
