= Terrenate, Tlaxcala =

Coordinates: 19°28′37″N 97°55′07″W

Terrenate
- Municipality
- Location in Mexico Terrenate (Mexico)
- Country: Mexico
- State: Tlaxcala
- Demonym: (in Spanish)
- Time zone: UTC−6 (CST)

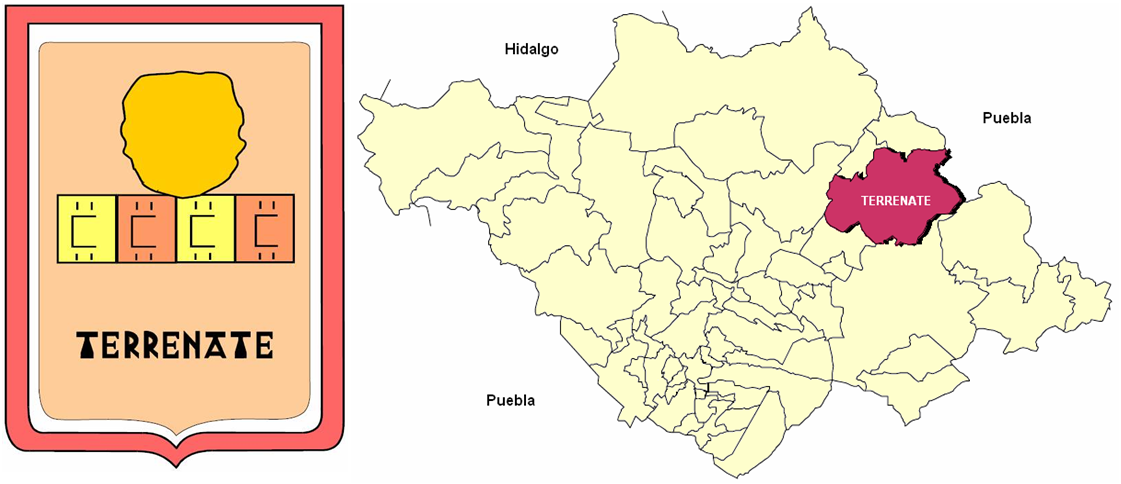
Terrenate municipal coat of arms and locator map

Terrenate (formally: San Nicolás Terrenate) is a city, and the surrounding municipality of the same name, in the Mexican state of Tlaxcala. It is situated in the highest part of the state, at 2,680 metres above sea level. "Terrenate" is a Nahuatl name meaning "land the colour of masa" (maize dough).

== Economy ==
Chiefly agricultural: crops and livestock. Little other industry or employment opportunities. Migration levels, particularly to the United States, are high.

== Geography ==
=== Location ===
Terrenate is in the extreme northeast of the state, adjacent to the municipalities of:

to the west, Tetla de la Solidaridad, Emiliano Zapata, and Lázaro Cárdenas
to the south, Huamantla and Xaloztoc
to the east, Altzayanca
to the north, Ixtacamaxtitlán in the neighbouring state of Puebla.

=== Climate ===
Climate data for Terrenate (1951–2010)
Month	Jan	Feb	Mar	Apr	May	Jun	Jul	Aug	Sep	Oct	Nov	Dec	Year
Record high °C (°F)	29.0 (84.2)	34.0 (93.2)	35.0 (95.0)	37.5 (99.5)	33.0 (91.4)	32.0 (89.6)	27.0 (80.6)	27.0 (80.6)	30.0 (86.0)	32.0 (89.6)	30.0 (86.0)	28.0 (82.4)	37.5 (99.5)
Mean daily maximum °C (°F)	20.6 (69.1)	21.7 (71.1)	23.2 (73.8)	24.0 (75.2)	23.4 (74.1)	21.6 (70.9)	21.2 (70.2)	21.3 (70.3)	21.0 (69.8)	21.5 (70.7)	21.4 (70.5)	21.0 (69.8)	21.8 (71.2)
Daily mean °C (°F)	12.2 (54.0)	13.1 (55.6)	14.4 (57.9)	15.7 (60.3)	15.7 (60.3)	15.1 (59.2)	14.4 (57.9)	14.4 (57.9)	14.3 (57.7)	14.1 (57.4)	13.4 (56.1)	12.7 (54.9)	14.1 (57.4)
Mean daily minimum °C (°F)	3.7 (38.7)	4.5 (40.1)	5.6 (42.1)	7.4 (45.3)	8.0 (46.4)	8.5 (47.3)	7.6 (45.7)	7.5 (45.5)	7.7 (45.9)	6.6 (43.9)	5.4 (41.7)	4.4 (39.9)	6.4 (43.5)
Record low °C (°F)	−5.5 (22.1)	−4.0 (24.8)	−5.5 (22.1)	0.0 (32.0)	1.0 (33.8)	1.0 (33.8)	1.0 (33.8)	2.0 (35.6)	0.0 (32.0)	−3.5 (25.7)	−3.0 (26.6)	−4.0 (24.8)	−5.5 (22.1)
Average precipitation mm (inches)	7.7 (0.30)	11.1 (0.44)	21.2 (0.83)	53.1 (2.09)	88.1 (3.47)	139.1 (5.48)	89.7 (3.53)	111.5 (4.39)	100.0 (3.94)	60.0 (2.36)	15.7 (0.62)	7.9 (0.31)	705.1 (27.76)
Average precipitation days (≥ 0.1 mm)	1.1	2.0	3.0	6.5	9.5	12.6	10.2	10.7	11.1	6.2	2.5	1.0	76.4
Source: Servicio Meteorologico Nacional

== Towns ==
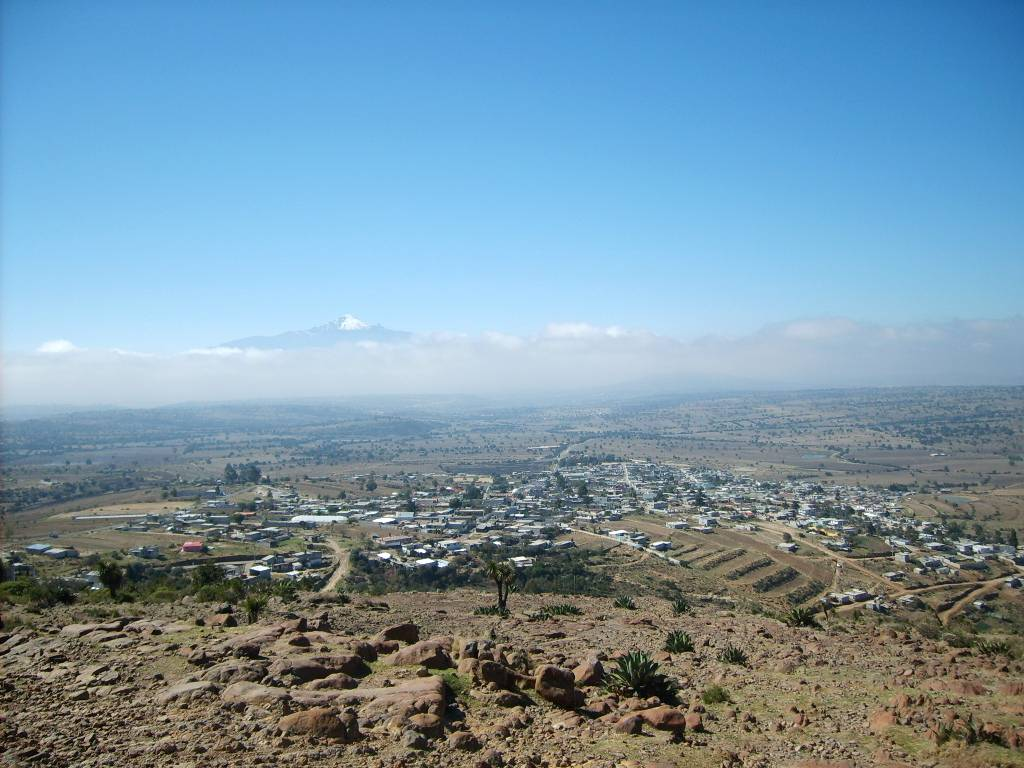
Terrenate (municipal seat)

In 1996, what are now the municipalities of Emiliano Zapata and Lázaro Cárdenas, were split off from Terrenate when the state created 16 new municipalities.

In addition to the municipal seat, the municipality has another six towns and numerous hamlets.

- San Nicolás Terrenate
- Toluca de Guadalupe
- Nicolás Bravo
- Villareal
- El Capulín
- Guadalupe Victoria (Tepetates)
- Los Ameles del Rosario (Acolco)

== Culture ==
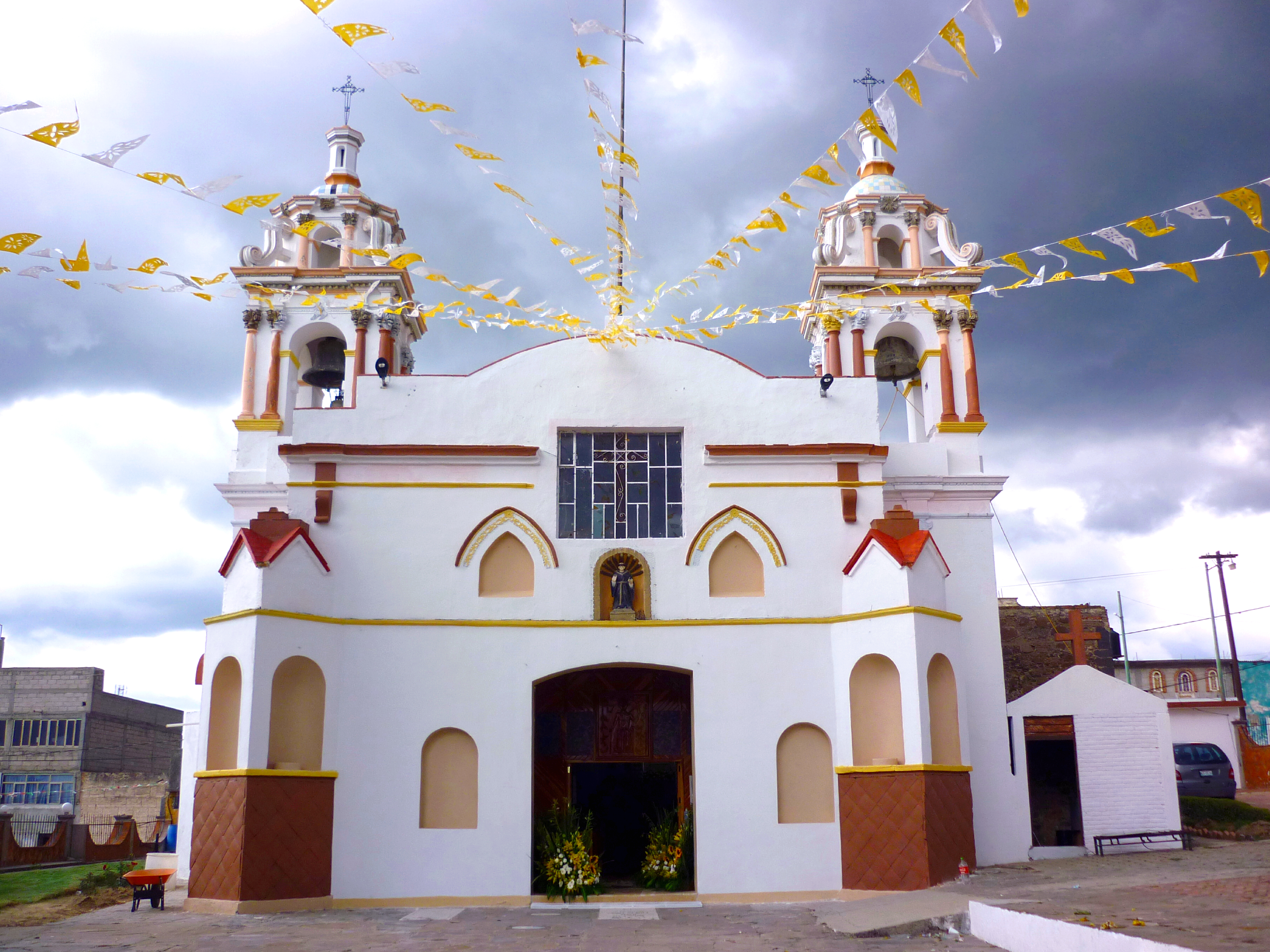
Church of San Nicolás de Tolentino. Terrenate, Tlaxcala.

The church of San Nicolás de Tolentino in the municipal seat dates from the 17th century.
