= Tlaxco, Tlaxcala =

Tlaxco
- Municipality
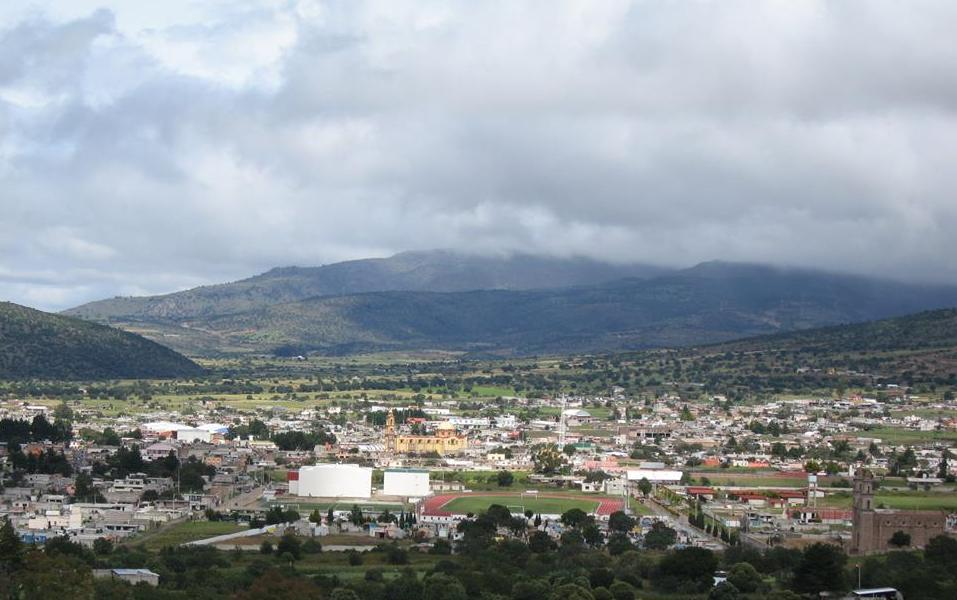
- The town and municipal seat of Tlaxco

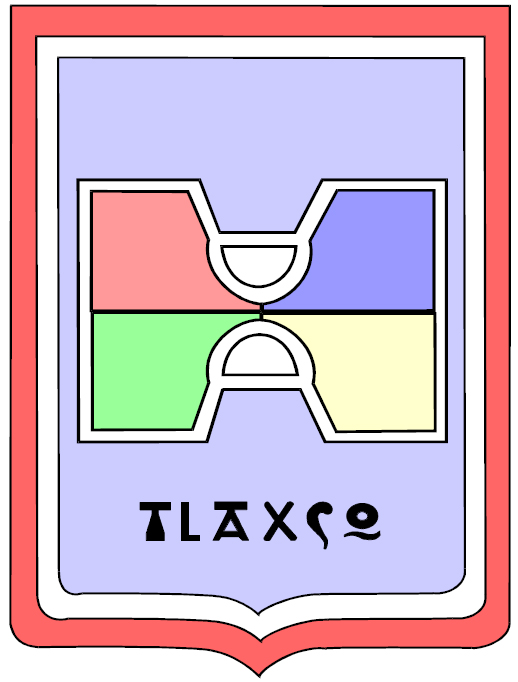
- Coat of arms

- Location in Tlaxcala

- Location in Mexico Tlaxco (Tlaxcala)
- Coordinates: 19°36′50″N 98°07′07″W
- Country: Mexico
- State: Tlaxcala
- Established: 29 August 1945
- Seat: Tlaxco

Government
  - Mayor: Armando Flores López

Area
  - Total: 575 km^{2} (222 sq mi)
- Elevation (of seat): 2,553 m (8,376 ft)
- Highest elevation (Cerro Peñas Coloradas): 3,360 m (11,020 ft)

Population (2010 Census)
  - Total: 39,939
  - Estimate (2015 Intercensal Survey): 42,536
  - Density: 69.5/km^{2} (180/sq mi)
  - Seat: 14,806
- Time zone: UTC-6 (Central)
- Postal code of seat: 90250
- Area code: 241
- Website: Official website

Tlaxco (Nahuatl: "place of the ball game") is a town and its surrounding municipality in the Mexican state of Tlaxcala.

== Geography ==
The municipality of Tlaxco is located in northern Tlaxcala on the border with Hidalgo and Puebla. From east to west on its northern side, it borders the municipalities of Ixtacamaxtitlán and Chignahuapan in Puebla, and Almoloya and Apan in Hidalgo. From east to west on its southern side, it borders the Tlaxcalan municipalities of Emiliano Zapata, Lázaro Cárdenas, Tetla de la Solidaridad, Atlangatepec, Muñoz de Domingo Arenas, Hueyotlipan and Benito Juárez. Tlaxco is Tlaxcala's largest municipality: it covers an area of 575 square kilometres (222 sq mi) and comprises 14.40% of the state's area.

Situated in the Mexican Altiplano, Tlaxco lies at an average altitude of 2,540 metres (8,330 ft) above sea level. The western and central parts of the municipality are relatively flat, while the northern and eastern parts of the municipality feature more rugged terrain. The highest point in the municipality is the Cerro Peñas Coloradas located at 19.6653°N 98.0531°W with an elevation of 3,360 metres (11,020 ft) above sea level. The Zahuapan River and its tributaries drain the central-eastern part of the municipality. There are also two reservoirs in the municipality, Lázaro Cárdenas in the extreme east and El Muerto in the west. Agricultural land comprises 65.43% of the municipality. Soils in the municipality include cambisols, fluvisols, lithosols, gleysols and andosols.

Tlaxco's climate is temperate sub-humid with the warmest months being March through May. June through September are the months with the most rain. Average annual precipitation ranges between 600 and 900 millimetres.

Climate data for Tlaxco weather station at 19°35′33″N 98°07′32″W, 2489 m above sea level (1951–2010)
Month	Jan	Feb	Mar	Apr	May	Jun	Jul	Aug	Sep	Oct	Nov	Dec	Year
Record high °C (°F)	30.0 (86.0)	33.0 (91.4)	34.0 (93.2)	36.0 (96.8)	37.5 (99.5)	40.0 (104.0)	30.0 (86.0)	30.0 (86.0)	29.0 (84.2)	30.5 (86.9)	30.0 (86.0)	41.0 (105.8)	41.0 (105.8)
Mean daily maximum °C (°F)	22.0 (71.6)	23.4 (74.1)	25.6 (78.1)	26.4 (79.5)	25.8 (78.4)	23.6 (74.5)	22.6 (72.7)	22.8 (73.0)	22.0 (71.6)	22.0 (71.6)	22.3 (72.1)	21.8 (71.2)	23.4 (74.1)
Daily mean °C (°F)	11.7 (53.1)	12.8 (55.0)	14.9 (58.8)	16.3 (61.3)	16.5 (61.7)	16.1 (61.0)	15.0 (59.0)	15.0 (59.0)	14.9 (58.8)	14.0 (57.2)	12.9 (55.2)	11.9 (53.4)	14.3 (57.7)
Mean daily minimum °C (°F)	1.5 (34.7)	2.3 (36.1)	4.3 (39.7)	6.1 (43.0)	7.3 (45.1)	8.5 (47.3)	7.4 (45.3)	7.2 (45.0)	7.8 (46.0)	5.9 (42.6)	3.5 (38.3)	2.1 (35.8)	5.3 (41.5)
Record low °C (°F)	−9.0 (15.8)	−9.0 (15.8)	−6.0 (21.2)	−6.0 (21.2)	−2.0 (28.4)	−1.0 (30.2)	0.0 (32.0)	0.0 (32.0)	−3.5 (25.7)	−8.0 (17.6)	−9.0 (15.8)	−8.0 (17.6)	−9.0 (15.8)
Average precipitation mm (inches)	11.8 (0.46)	8.9 (0.35)	13.8 (0.54)	41.6 (1.64)	72.0 (2.83)	127.4 (5.02)	124.2 (4.89)	120.9 (4.76)	110.2 (4.34)	60.1 (2.37)	15.0 (0.59)	6.7 (0.26)	712.6 (28.06)
Average precipitation days (≥ 0.1 mm)	1.8	2.2	3.3	7.5	11.1	14.6	16.2	16.0	14.5	8.0	3.3	1.8	100.3
Source: Servicio Meteorológico Nacional

== History ==
Although minor settlements have been found in the Tlaxco area dating back to the Texoloc phase or Middle Formative period, sedentary settlement of the area properly began in the Tezoquipan phase or Late Formative period by proto-Teotihuacan peoples who share elements of the Tezoquipan culture. From 650 to 850 AD, northern Tlaxcala experienced a period of political instability known as the Acopinalco Complex, during which many different cultural groups competed for control over the area. By 900 AD a group of Huastec or Otomi people had prevailed, and subsequent cultural homogenization resulted in formation of the Tlaxco culture which would later become associated with the city of Tliliuhquitepec.

Franciscans had arrived in Tlaxco by 1614, which was then part of the municipality of Atlangatepec. After 1820 Tlaxco began to exist as a separate administrative division of Tlaxcala, with only minor interruptions. By the end of the 19th century, Tlaxco had become an important centre for the production of pulque. Porfirio Díaz visited Tlaxco in January 1894 and inaugurated the municipal palace. The modern municipality of Tlaxco was established on 29 August 1945 with the publication of the Organic Law of Municipalities in the State of Tlaxcala. In 1956 a highway linking Apizaco and Chignahuapan via Tlaxco was completed.

== Administration ==
The municipal government comprises a president, a councillor (Spanish: síndico), and seven trustees (regidores) elected by proportional representation. The current president of the municipality is Gardenia Hernández Rodríguez.

== Demographics ==
In the 2010 Mexican Census, the municipality of Tlaxco recorded a population of 39,939 inhabitants living in 9356 households. It recorded a population of 42,536 inhabitants in the 2015 Intercensal Survey.

There are 155 localities in the municipality, two of which are classified as urban:

- Tlaxco, the municipal seat, which recorded a population of 14,806 inhabitants in the 2010 Census, and was designated a pueblo mágico by Mexico's Secretariat of Tourism in 2015; and
- San José Atotonilco, which had 3220 inhabitants in 2010.

== Economy ==
The main economic activity in Tlaxco is agriculture. The gross domestic product of the municipality was unofficially estimated at 1176.1 million Mexican pesos in 2010.
