= Javier García González =

Mexican politician

Deputy of the Congress of the Union for the 1st district of Tlaxcala
- In office 1 September 2000 – 31 August 2003
- Preceded by: José Pascual Grande Sánchez
- Succeeded by: Gelacio Montiel Fuentes

Personal details
- Born: 21 November 1942 (age 83) Apizaco, Tlaxcala, Mexico
- Party: PRI
- Occupation: Politician

Javier García González (born 21 November 1942) is a Mexican politician from the Institutional Revolutionary Party (PRI).

Javier García González was born in the municipality of Apizaco, Tlaxcala. He holds a law degree from the National Autonomous University of Mexico (UNAM). From 2000 to 2003 he served as a federal deputy in the 58th Congress, representing Tlaxcala's first district.
