= Alejandro Aguilar López =

Mexican politician

Deputy of the Congress of the Union for the 1st district of Tlaxcala
- Incumbent
- Assumed office 1 September 2021

Deputy of the Congress of the Union for the 1st district of Tlaxcala
- In office 1 September 2006 – 31 August 2009
- Preceded by: Martha Palafox Gutiérrez
- Succeeded by: Oralia López Hernández

Personal details
- Born: 24 April 1963 (age 63) Huamantla, Tlaxcala, Mexico
- Party: PT (since 2018)
- Other political affiliations: PAN (2002–2018)
- Occupation: Politician

José Alejandro Aguilar López (Note: In this Mexican name, the surname is Aguilar and the second or maternal family name is López.) (born 24 April 1963) is a Mexican politician. He is a native of the city of Huamantla, Tlaxcala.

From 2006 to 2009 he served in the Chamber of Deputies during the 60th Congress representing Tlaxcala's 1st district for the National Action Party (PAN). He resigned his seat on 23 February 2009 to take office as Secretary of Economic Development of the Tlaxcala state government.

He has also served two terms as municipal president of Huamantla: 2002–2005 and 2014–2017. In 2018, he left the PAN, to which he had belonged since 2002, and joined Labour Party (PT).

In the 2021 mid-terms, he was the candidate of the Juntos Hacemos Historia ("Together We Make History") coalition for Tlaxcala's 1st. He was elected to the 65th Congress and joined the parliamentary group of the Labour Party (PT). During the session he served as the secretary of the Culture and Cinematography Commission and on the commissions of Rural Development and Conservation, Agriculture and Food Self-Sufficiency; and, Economy, Commerce and Competitiveness.

He was re-elected to the same seat in the 2024 general election.
