= María Salazar =

María Salazar may refer to:

- María Elvira Salazar (born 1961), American journalist, author, and politician
- María Guadalupe Salazar (born 1943), Mexican politician
- María Isabel Salazar (born 1980), Bolivian footballer
- María Santos Gorrostieta Salazar (1976–2012), Mexican physician and politician
- María Alejandra Salazar (born 1997), Colombian model and beauty pageant titleholder
- Maria Salazar, a fictional character in the comic book series Deadly Class and the 2019 TV adaptation
