= Coat of arms of Tlaxcala =

Coat of arms of Tlaxcala Escudo de Tlaxcala
- Coat of Arms of Tlaxcala
- Armiger: State of Tlaxcala
- Adopted: 1989

The coat of arms of Tlaxcala, a federal entity located in central highlands of Mexico, is a representative symbol that encapsulates the rich history and cultural identity of this region. Designed with meticulous attention to detail, this heraldic emblem reflects both the pre-Hispanic heritage and the colonial influence that have marked Tlaxcala's trajectory throughout the centuries. Its visual composition combines emblematic elements that evoke indigenous tradition, such as the emblematic Maltese cross, with symbols of the Catholic faith and references to native flora and fauna. Through its symbolism, the coat of arms of Tlaxcala draws a bridge between the past and the present, serving as an emblem of identity and pride for the inhabitants of this Mexican state.

== Symbolism ==
The castle in gold on gules is the emblem of Castile, which represents the fortresses built during the Reconquista. In the context of Tlaxcala, it represents that city as a new Castile, victorious over the Mexicas during the Conquest. The eagle in black on gold is the heraldic image of the House of Habsburg, to which Charles I belonged, who granted the shield. The argent border represents the Catholic faith, which the Tlaxcalans would have embraced without opposition. The initials correspond to the Latinized names of Queen Joan of Castile, Charles himself and the then Prince Philip. The two crowns represent the aforementioned Joan, Queen of Castile and her son Charles V, Holy Roman Emperor monarch of the same Crown. The palms are a symbol of victory, in this case over the Mexicas. The skulls and tibias evoke similar pre-Hispanic glyphs and may refer to human sacrifices in Mesoamerican culture; it has been suggested that they represent the Mexicas killed during the capture of Tenochtitlan in 1521.

== History ==
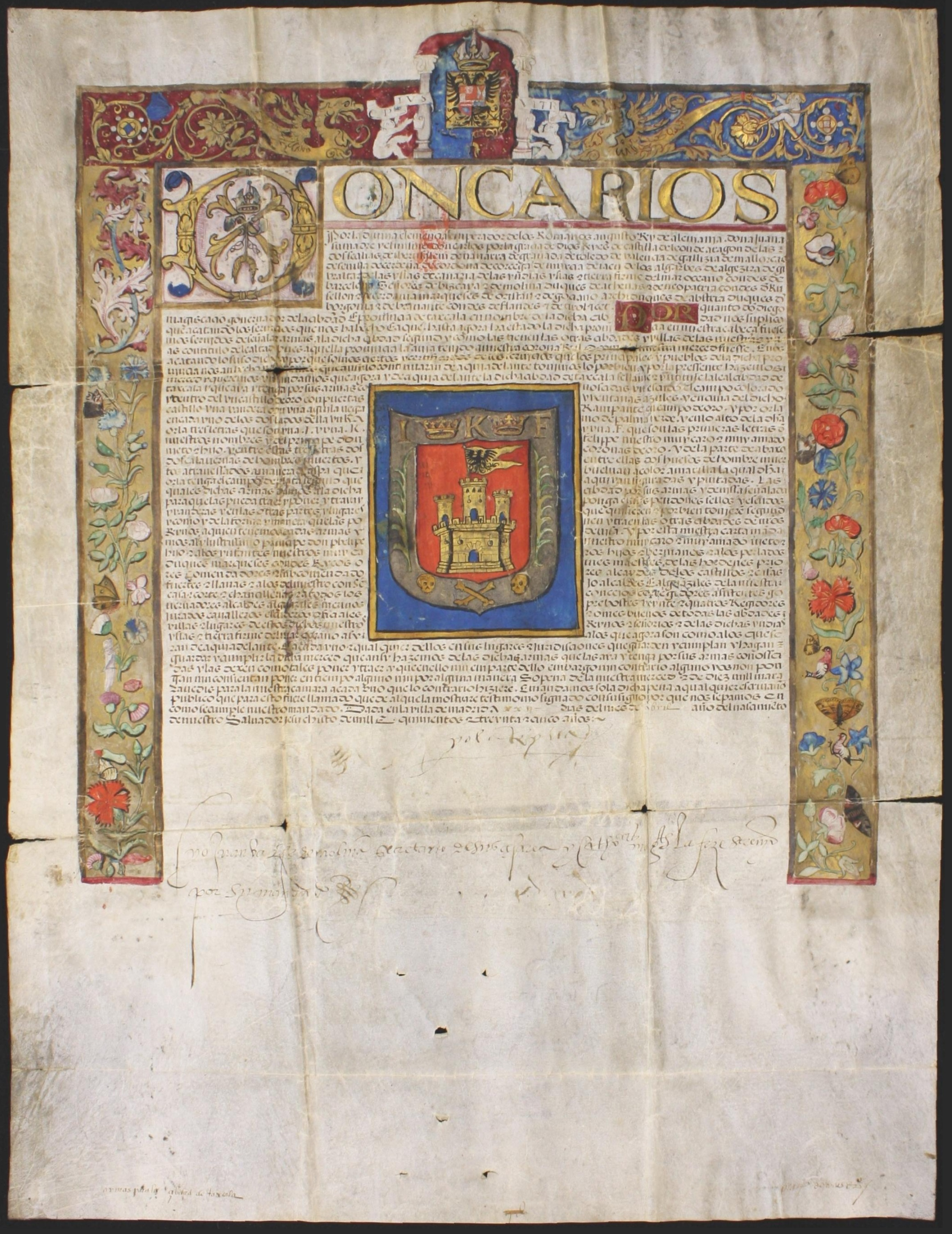
Real provisión.

The coat of arms of the state of Tlaxcala, officially adopted on March 14, 1956, stands as a tangible testimony to the history and cultural evolution of the region. It is the only state coat of arms expressly requested by local authorities from the Spanish monarch in colonial times. Its intrinsic elements tell a complex story that spans from pre-Columbian civilizations to the colonial era and the contemporary era. This amalgam of symbols reflects the diversity and cultural richness of Kingdom of Tlaxcala, a state that has played a crucial role in shaping modern Mexico. In this context, the shield not only acts as a heraldic badge, but also as an emotional link that connects the Tlaxcaltecans with their ancestral past and projects their identity into the future.

== See also ==
- Coat of arms of Mexico
- Flag of Tlaxcala
- Himno a Tlaxcala
