= Adriana Dávila Fernández =

Mexican politician

- Born: 30 December 1970 (age 55); Apizaco, Tlaxcala, Mexico
- Occupation: Senator
- Political party: PAN

Adriana Dávila Fernández (born 30 December 1970) is a Mexican politician affiliated with the PAN. She currently serves as Senator of the LXII Legislature of the Mexican Congress representing Tlaxcala. She also served as Deputy during the LX Legislature.
