= Gelacio Montiel =

Mexican politician

- Born: 21 November 1961 (age 64); Tetla, Tlaxcala, Mexico
- Occupation: Politician
- Political party: PRD

Gelacio Montiel Fuentes (born 21 November 1961) is a Mexican politician affiliated with the Party of the Democratic Revolution.

In 2003–2006 he served as a federal deputy in the 59th Congress, representing Tlaxcala's first district. He also contended, unsuccessfully, for a Senate seat in the 2018 general election.
