= María Guadalupe Sánchez Santiago =

Mexican politician

- Born: 7 September 1951 (age 74); Tlaxcala, Mexico
- Occupation: Deputy
- Political party: PRI

María Guadalupe Sánchez Santiago (born 7 September 1951) is a Mexican politician affiliated with the Institutional Revolutionary Party (PRI). In 2012–2015 she served as a federal deputy in the 62nd Congress, representing Tlaxcala's first district.
