= Oralia López Hernández =

Mexican politician

- Born: 16 October 1959 (age 66); Tetla, Tlaxcala, Mexico
- Occupation: Politician
- Political party: PAN

Oralia López Hernández (born 16 October 1959) is a Mexican politician from the National Action Party. From 2009 to 2012 she served as Deputy of the LXI Legislature of the Mexican Congress representing Tlaxcala.
