= Xaloztoc =

- Municipality
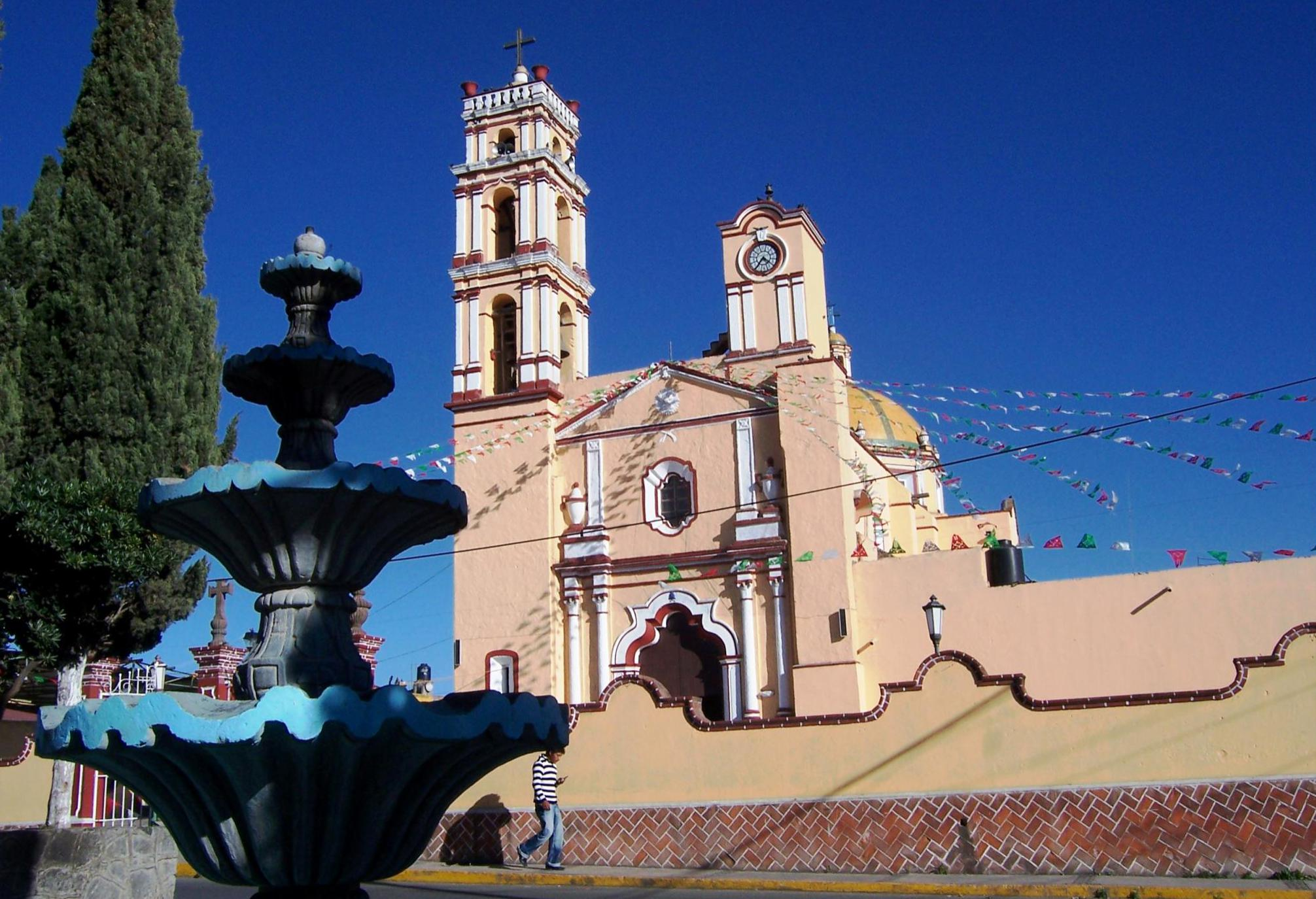
- Church of Saints Cosmas and Damian, Xaloztoc

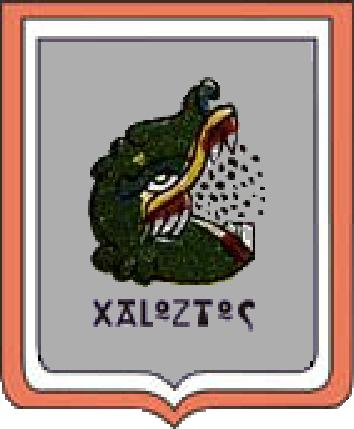
- Coat of arms

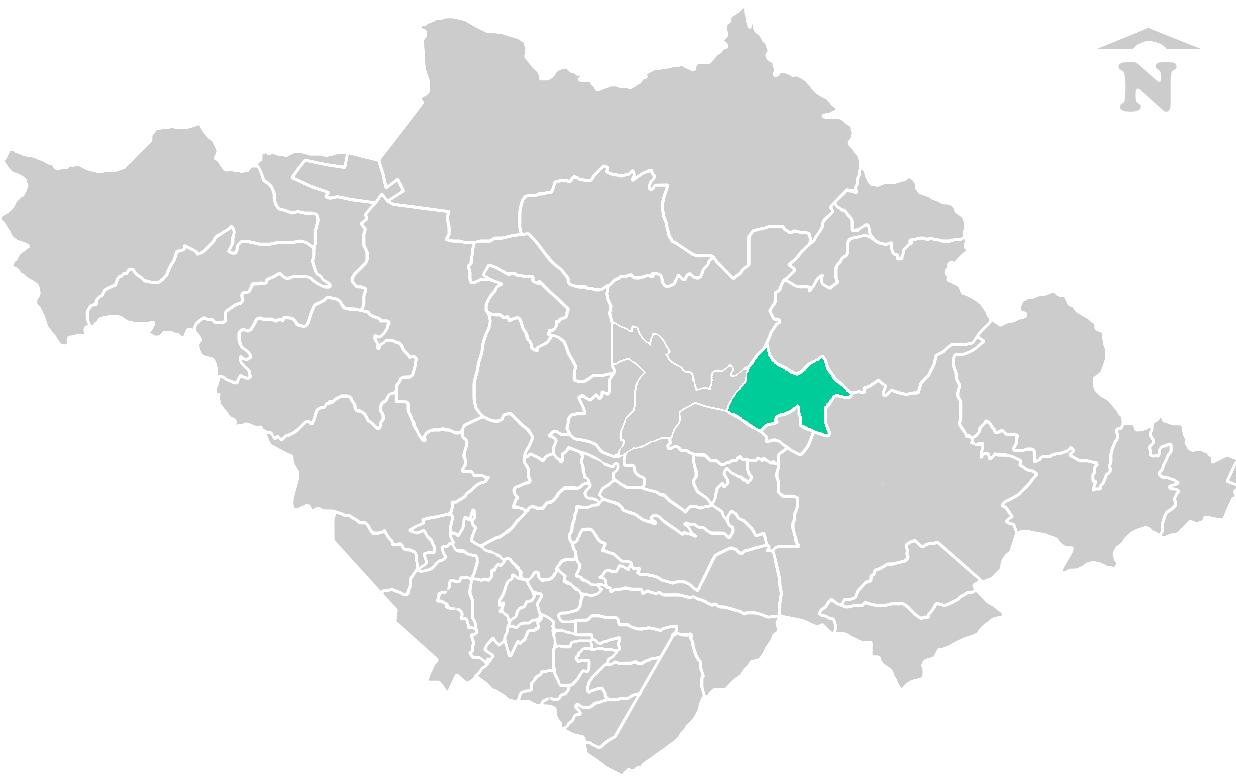

- Location within Tlaxcala Location within Mexico
- Coordinates: 19°24′00″N 98°3′0″W
- Country: Mexico
- State: Tlaxcala
- Established: 25 November 1873

Area
  - Total: 49 km^{2} (19 sq mi)
- Elevation: 2,500 m (8,200 ft)

Population (2020)
  - Total: 25,607
  - Density: 444.27/km^{2} (1,150.7/sq mi)
- Time zone: UTC-6 (Central)
- Area code: 241
- Website: xaloztoc.gob.mx

Xaloztoc is a town and its surrounding municipality in the Mexican state of Tlaxcala. It is one of 60 municipalities in the state. The INEGI reference number for the municipality is 29039.

The name derives from the Nahuatl xal ("sand"), azto ("cave") and the locative suffix c.

== Geography ==
In 2020 the municipality of Xaloztoc had 25,607 residents, up 17.6% from the 2010 figure. The size of the municipality is about 49 km^{2} (19 sq mi). The average elevation is 2,500 meters (8,200 ft) above sea level.

=== Climate ===
On average, Xaloztoc receives 730.3 mm/m^{2} (28.8 in) of precipitation annually. The average yearly temperature for the area is approximately 14.8 °C (58.6 °F).
