= María Isabel Salazar =

Bolivian footballer (born 1980)

Personal information
- Full name: María Isabel Salazar García
- Date of birth: 22 September 1980 (age 46)
- Position: Midfielder

International career^{‡}
| Years | Team | Apps | (Gls) |
| 2006 | Bolivia | 2 | (0) |
- ‡ National team caps and goals as of 13 November 2006.

María Isabel Salazar García (born 22 September 1980) is a Bolivian former footballer who played as a midfielder. She has been a member of the Bolivia women's national team.

== Early life ==
Salazar hails from the La Paz Department.

== International career ==
Salazar capped for Bolivia at senior level during the 2006 South American Women's Football Championship.
