= María Guadalupe Salazar =

Mexican politician (born 1943)

María Guadalupe mayorga
- Born: 21 March 1943 (age 83); Guadalajara, Jalisco, Mexico
- Occupation: Politician
- Political party: PAN

María Guadalupe Salazar Anaya (born 21 March 1943) is a Mexican politician from the National Action Party. In 2009 she served as Deputy of the LX Legislature of the Mexican Congress representing Tlaxcala.
