= Himno a Tlaxcala =

Mexican anthem

English: Anthem of Tlaxcala
- State anthem of Tlaxcala
- Lyrics: Carlos Cea y Díaz
- Music: Carlos Cea y Díaz
- Adopted: 31 October 1986

Himno a Tlaxcala (English: Anthem of Tlaxcala) is the official anthem of the Mexican state of Tlaxcala. The music and lyrics were created by Carlos Cea y Díaz.

== Lyrics ==
Spanish lyrics

Coro:
Como el sol que corona el Matlalcuéyetl
con un halo de luz casi divino,
es Tlaxcala el futuro esplendoroso
que te forja invencible nuestra fe.
Tu pasado de gestas prodigiosas
que ilumina imponente tu destino,
es la fuerza que impulsa vigorosa
el anhelo creador en nuestro ser.

I
Las indígenas tribus te fundaron
y su raza en la nuestra se volcó,
y fue el choque brutal con el hispano
el crisol que tu espíritu forjó.
Fuiste cuna sin par del mestizaje
que en la patria naciente floreció
¡tú fundiste el acero y el plumaje!
¡fuiste tú la raíz de la Nación!

Coro

II
Hoy las armas que esgrimen nuestra lucha
son las armas de paz y de amistad,
del esfuerzo fecundo que florece
en el logro de pan con dignidad.
Y el arrojo del joven Xicohténcatl
y la fuerza indomable en Tlahuicole,
¡son la herencia que alienta en nuestra raza
nuestro heroico afán de libertad!

Coro

III
¡Sea en su gloria, guerreros tlaxcaltecas
nuestro esfuerzo y trabajo, y nuestra fe!

English translation

Chorus:
Like the sun that crowns the Matlalcuéyetl
with an almost divine halo of light
Tlaxcala is the splendorous future
that forges our faith invincible ...
Your past of prodigious deeds
that illuminates your destiny imposingly
is the force that vigorously drives
the creative desire in our being.

I
The indigenous tribes you've founded,
And their race in ours was overturned
And it was the brutal clash with the Hispanic
The crucible that your spirit forged...
You were the unparalleled cradle of miscegenation
That flourished in the rising homeland
You blended the iron and plumage!
You blended the roots of the nation!

Chorus

II
Today the weapons that put forward our struggle,
Are the weapons of peace and friendship,
Of the fruitful effort that flourishes
In achieving sustenance with dignity...
And the courage of a young Xicohténcatl
And the indomitable strength of Tlahuicole
Are the inheritance that encourages our race
Our heroic bid for freedom!

Chorus

III
"Be in His glory, Tlaxcaltec warriors
Our efforts and hard work... and our faith!"
