= Censo Económico =

Economic survey and census in Mexico

The Censo Económico, or National Economic Census, is an exhaustive survey and census that presents economic data of every economic unit in Mexico. It covers the extractive and transformation industries, manufacturing sector, construction, commerce, transport and communication, and services. It only excludes agriculture, forestry, and hunting. It is carried out by Mexico's national statistics body INEGI (Instituto Nacional de Estadística, Geografía e Informática), and information has been collected approximately every five years since 1930.

The national economic censuses of 1999 and 2004 are based on the North American Industry Classification System (NAIC), also used by Statistics Canada and the Economic Classification Policy Committee of the United States. The NAIC is a unique industrial classification system that groups economic activities based on a criterion of similitude in their production process.

The dataset contains aggregate data about production, gross value, number of employees, sales, costs, labour, value of physical assets, depreciation of physical assets, and financial assets. The highest geographical disaggregation of data is at municipal level.
