= Atlangatepec =

- Municipality
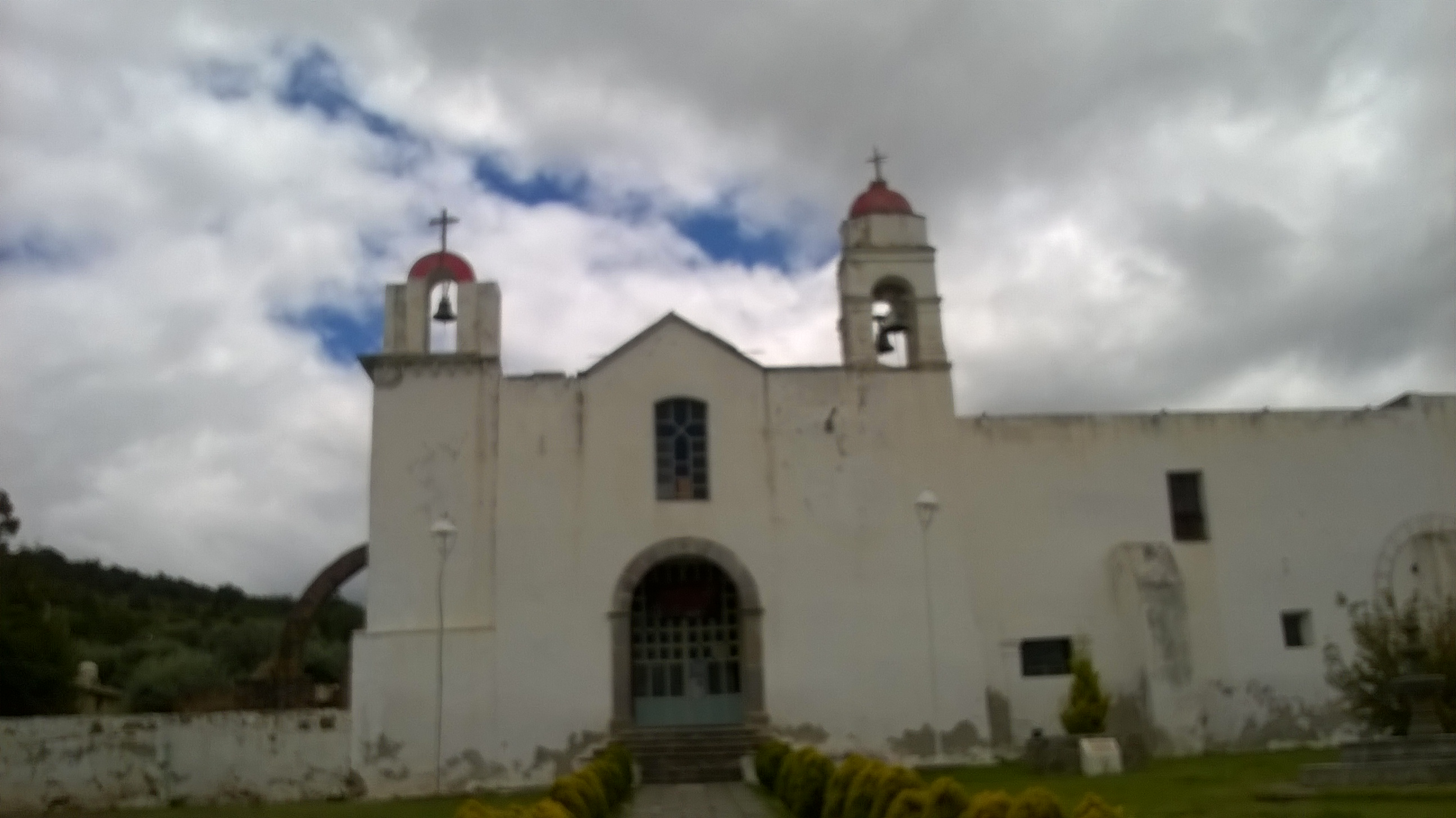

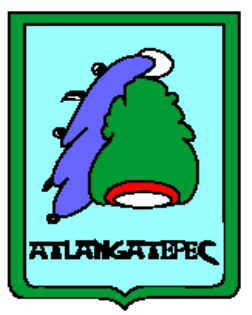
- Coat of arms

- Location within Tlaxcala Location within Mexico
- Country: Mexico
- State: Tlaxcala

Government
  - Presidente municipal: José Macías González
- Time zone: UTC-6 (Central)

Atlangatepec is a municipality in the central Mexican state of Tlaxcala.
