= National Institute of Statistics and Geography =

Mexican census data organization

Instituto Nacional de Estadística y Geografía (INEGI)

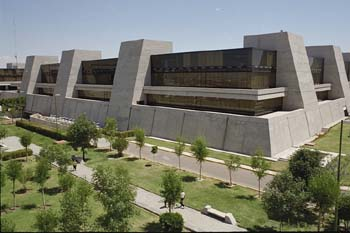
- INEGI's headquarters

Agency overview
- Formed: January 25, 1983
- Headquarters: Aguascalientes, Ags.
- Agency executive: Graciela Márquez Colín, Chairperson
- Website: www.inegi.org.mx

The National Institute of Statistics and Geography (INEGI from its former name in Spanish: Instituto Nacional de Estadística, Geografía e Informática) is an autonomous agency of the Mexican government dedicated to coordinate the National System of Statistical and Geographical Information of the country. It was created on January 25, 1983, by presidential decree of Miguel de la Madrid.

It is the institution responsible for conducting the Censo General de Población y Vivienda every ten years; as well as the economic census every five years and the agricultural, livestock and forestry census of the country. The job of gathering statistical information of the Institute includes the monthly gross domestic product, consumer trust surveys and proportion of commercial samples; employment and occupation statistics, domestic and couple violence; as well as many other jobs that are the basis of studies and projections to other governmental institutions.

The Institute headquarters are in the city of Aguascalientes in central Mexico.

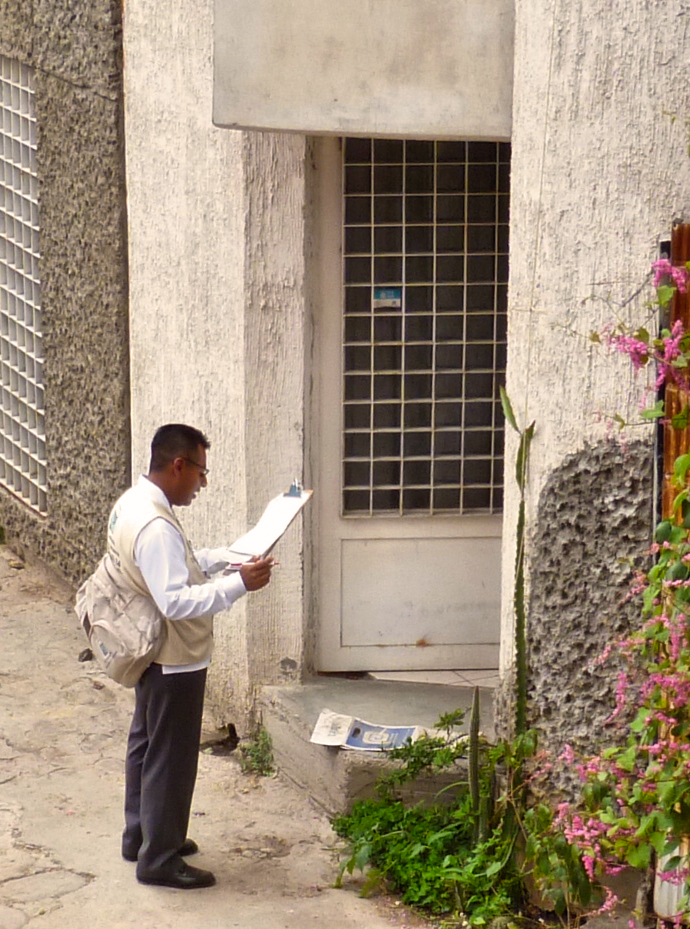
An INEGI employee going door-to-door gathering Census information in Oaxaca de Juárez.

== See also ==
- Sociedad Mexicana de Geografía y Estadística
- Survey of Occupation and Employment
