= Lázaro Cárdenas, Tlaxcala =

Municipality in Tlaxcala in Mexico

Coordinates: 19°32′N 97°59′W

Lázaro Cárdenas
- Municipality
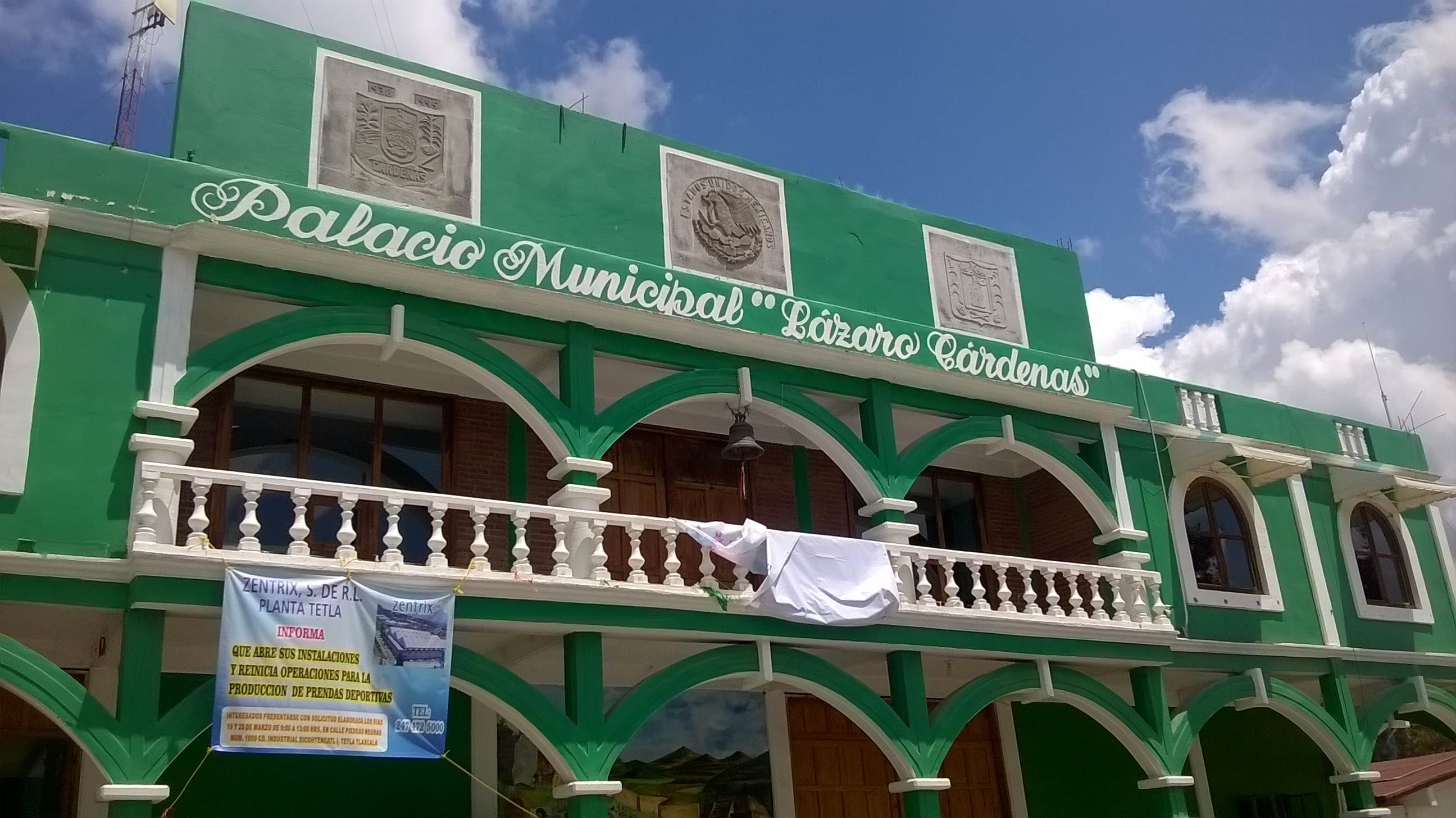

- Location within Tlaxcala Location within Mexico
- Country: Mexico
- State: Tlaxcala
- Time zone: UTC-6 (Central)

Lázaro Cárdenas (Spanish: [ˈlasaɾo ˈkaɾðenas]) is a town and its surrounding municipality in the Mexican state of Tlaxcala.
