= Apizaco Municipality =

Coordinates: 19.4352°N 98.1368°W

- Municipality
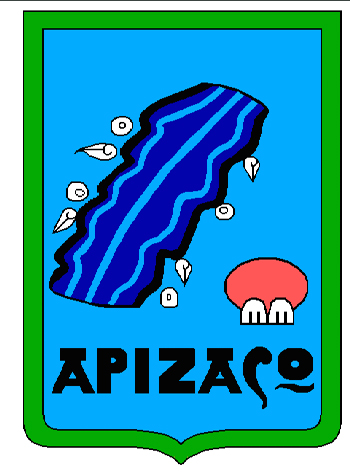
- Coat of arms
- Interactive map of Apizaco Municipality
- Country: Mexico
- State: Tlaxcala
- Seat: Apizaco
- Time zone: UTC-6 (Central)

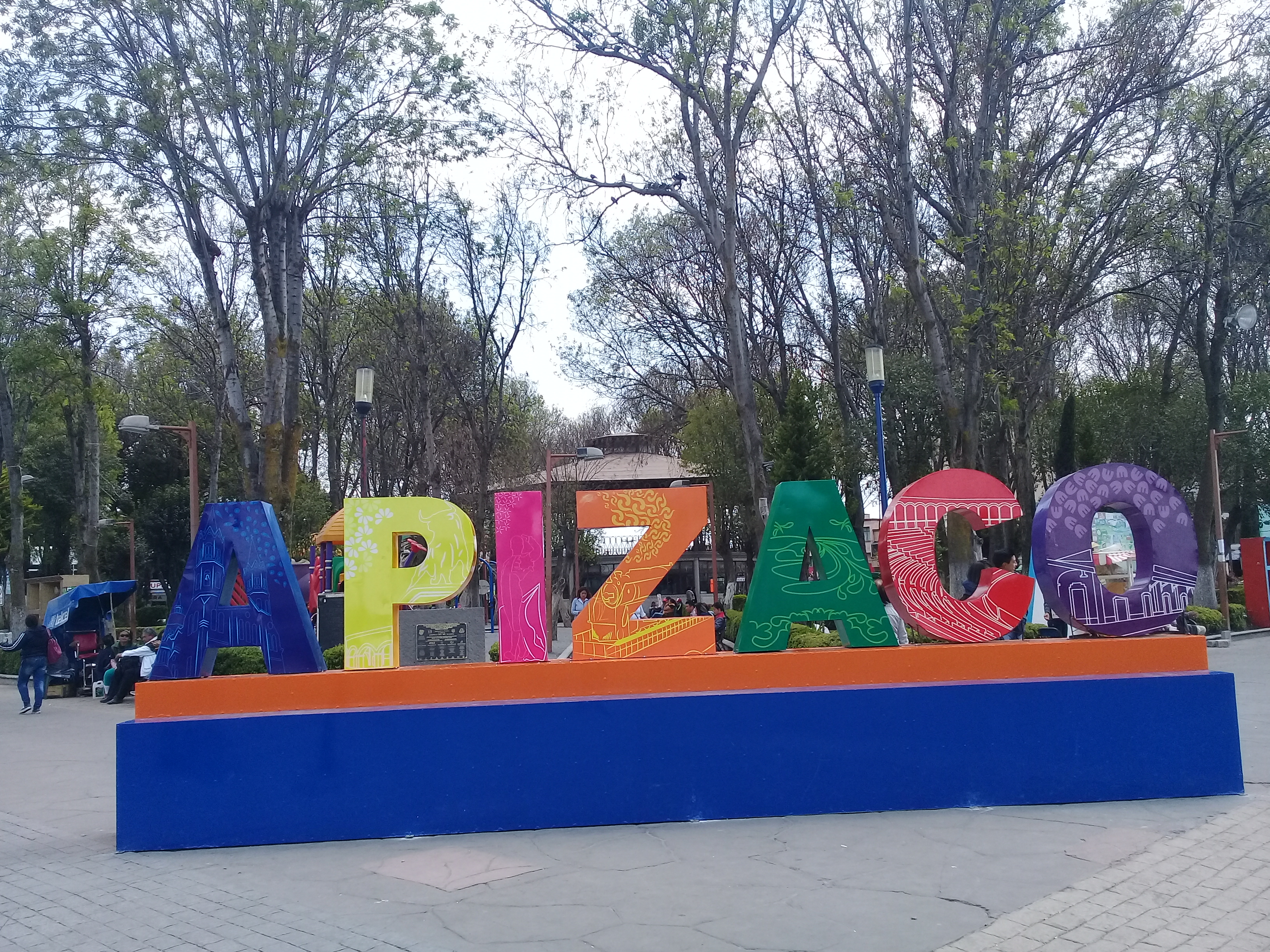
Apizaco Municipality’s logo

Apizaco is a municipality in the central Mexican state of Tlaxcala. Its seat is the city of Apizaco.
