= Altzayanca =

Altzayanca Municipality
- Municipality
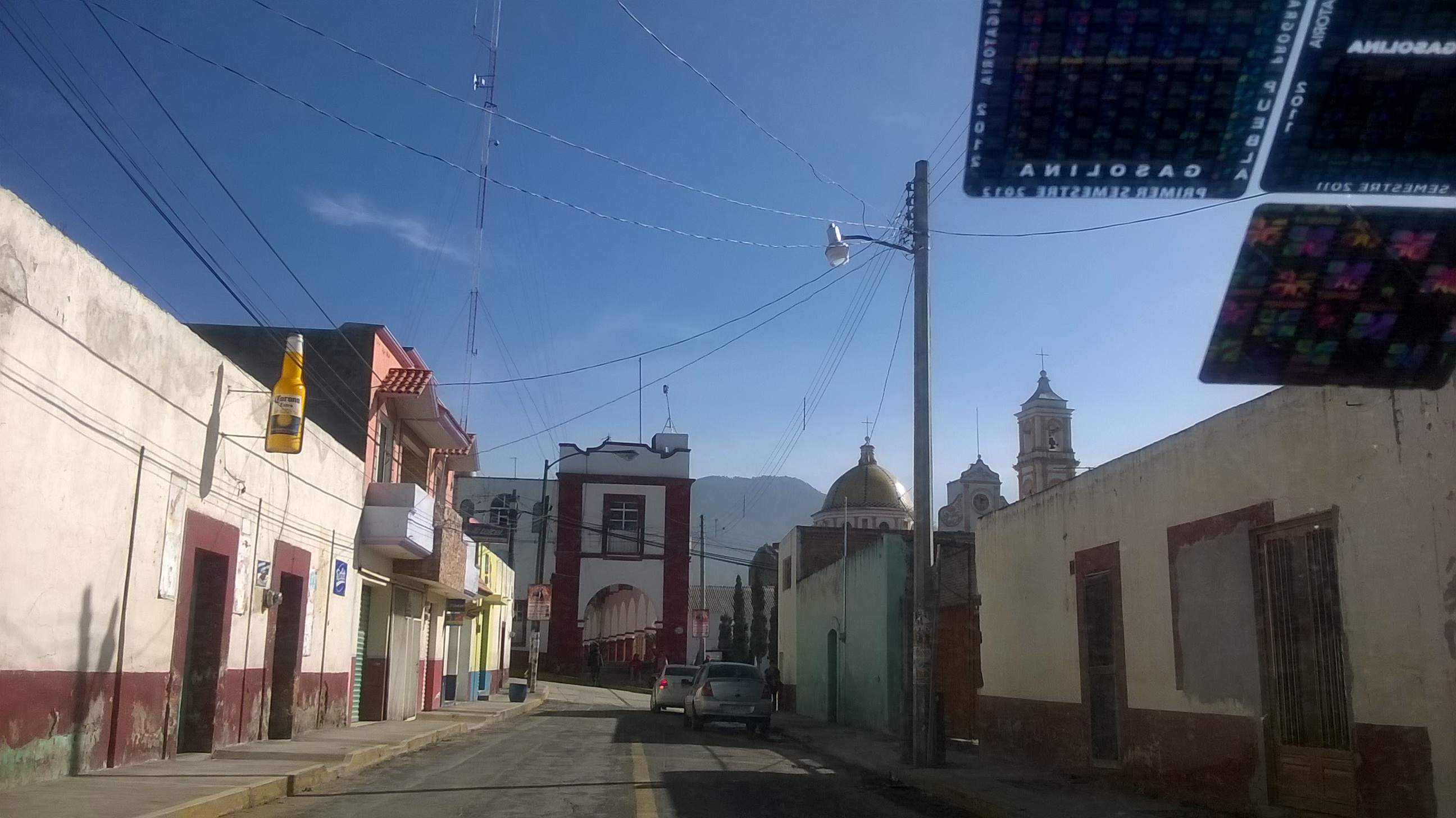

- Location within Tlaxcala Location within Mexico
- Coordinates: 19°26′N 97°47′W
- Country: Mexico
- State: Tlaxcala
- Time zone: UTC-6 (Central)

Altzayanca is one of the 60 municipalities in the Mexican state of Tlaxcala.
