= Emiliano Zapata, Tlaxcala =

Emiliano Zapata
- Municipality
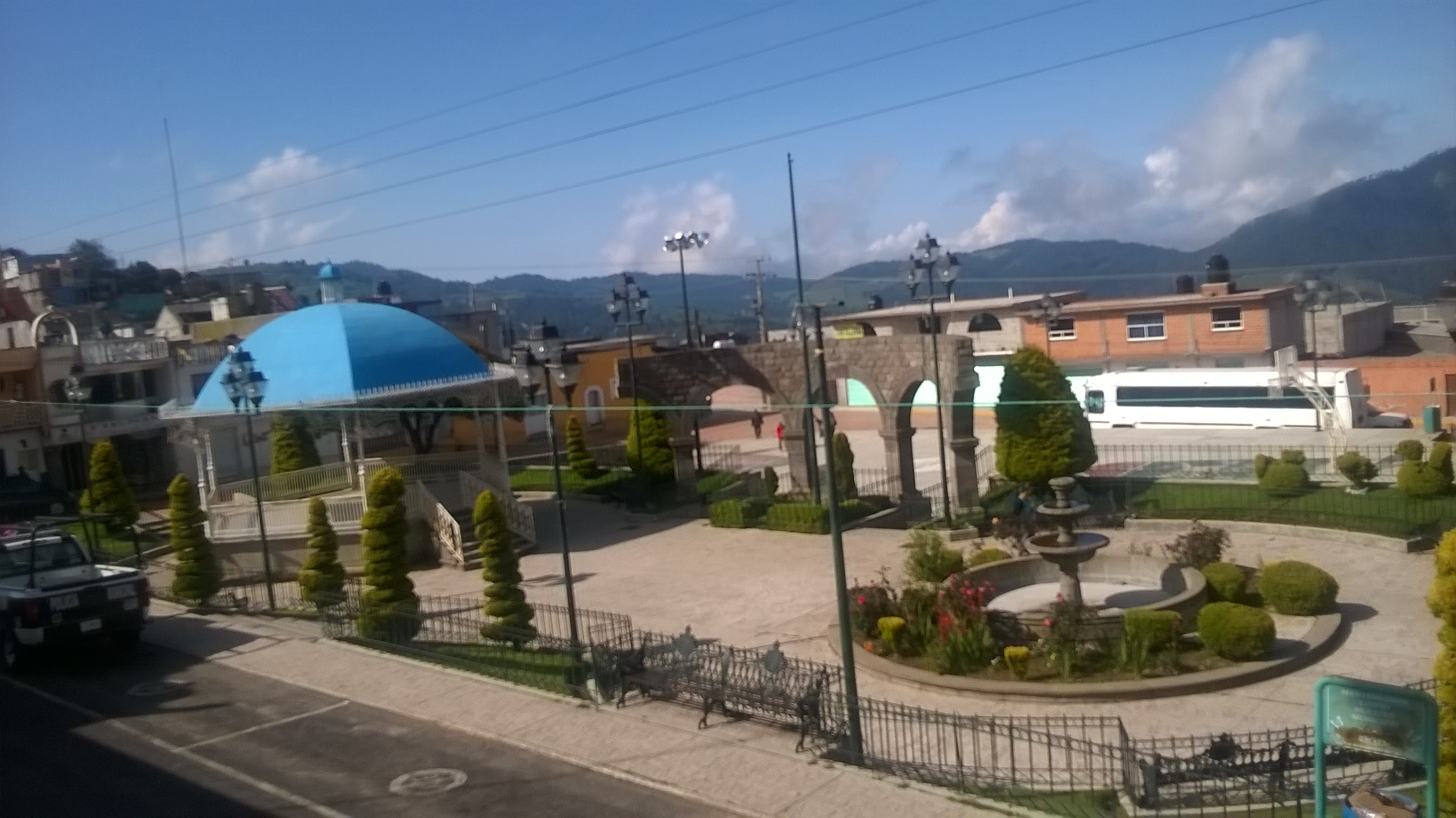
- Interactive map of Emiliano Zapata
- Coordinates: 19°33′31″N 97°55′00″W
- Country: Mexico
- State: Tlaxcala
- Elevation: 2,884 m (9,462 ft)

Population (2010)
  - Municipality: 4,146
  - Urban: 2,843
- Time zone: UTC-6 (Central)

Emiliano Zapata is a town and its surrounding municipality in the Mexican state of Tlaxcala. As of the 2010 census, the municipality had a total population of 4,146 inhabitants. The town of Emiliano Zapata had a population of 2,843 inhabitants. The town stands at an official elevation of 2,884 meters (9,462 ft.), the highest of any municipal seat in Mexico.
