= Tetla =

- town
- Location in Chhattisgarh, India Tetla (India)
- Coordinates: 21°48′0″N 83°20′0″E
- Country: India
- State: Chhattisgarh
- District: Raigarh
- Elevation: 224 m (735 ft)

Languages
  - Official: Hindi, Chhattisgarhi
- Time zone: UTC+5:30 (IST)
- PIN: 496100
- Vehicle registration: CG

Tetla is a town in Raigarh district, Chhattisgarh, India.

== Geography ==
It is located at an altitude of 224 m above MSL.

== Location ==
National Highway 200 passes through Tetla. It is about 12 km south of Raigarh. The nearest airport is Raipur Airport, and the nearest railway station is at Raigarh.
