= Apizaco =

Coordinates: 19°25′0″N 98°08′0″W

- Municipality
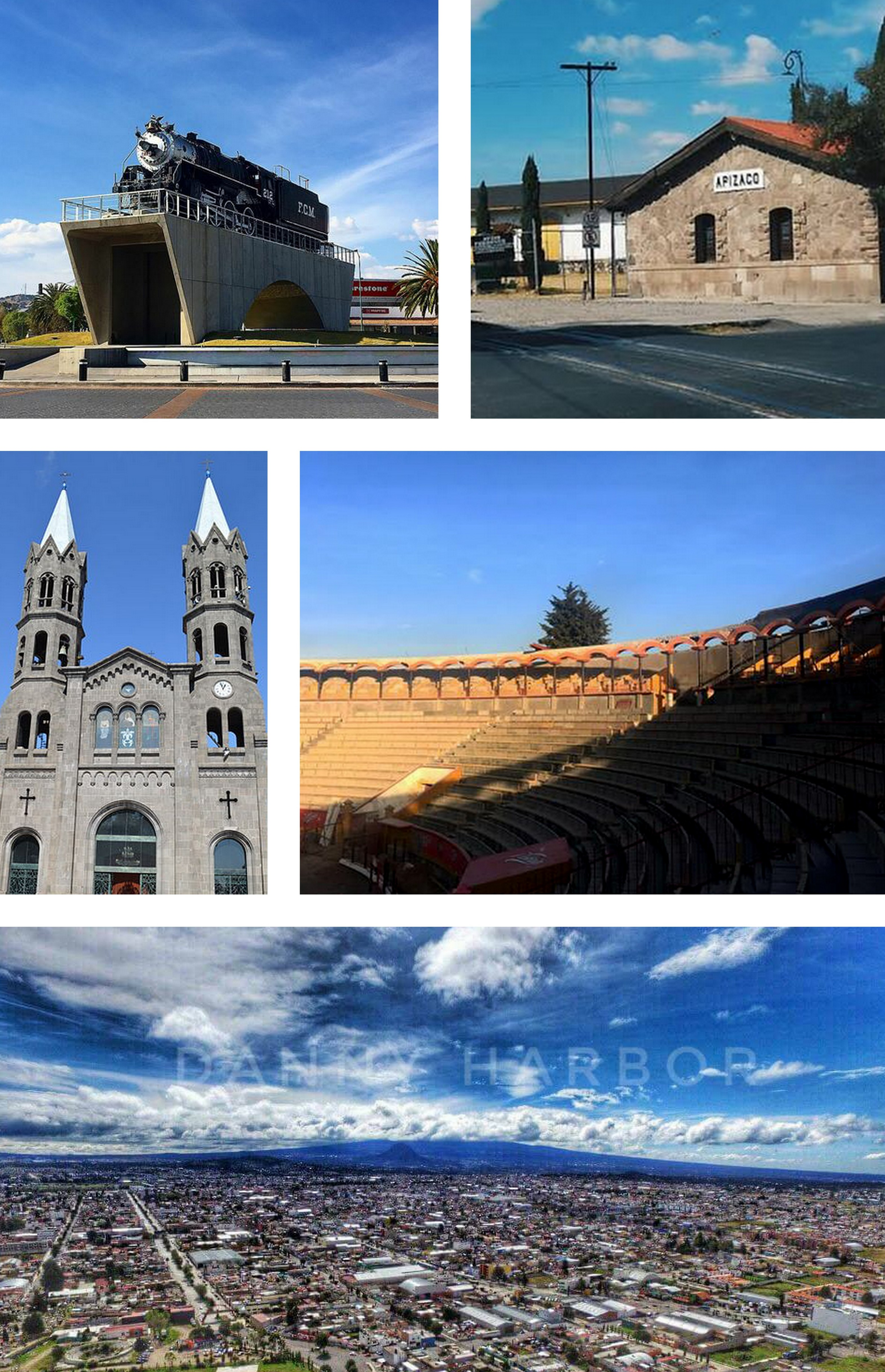
- Top:Apizaco little steam locomotive machine (La Maquinita de Apizaco), Piedra House Museum, Second:Basilica of Santa Maria de la Misericordia (Apizaco Cathedral), Apizaco Bullring (Plaza de toros Apizaco), Bottom:Panoramic view of Apizaco (all item from left to right)

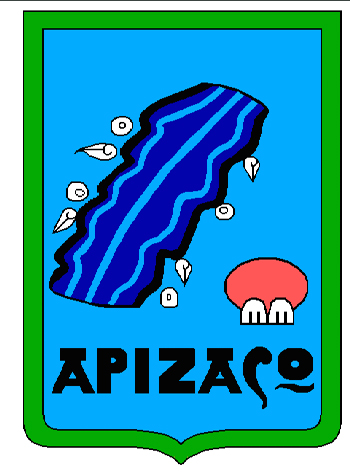
- Seal
- Nickname: Spanish: Ciudad Rielera
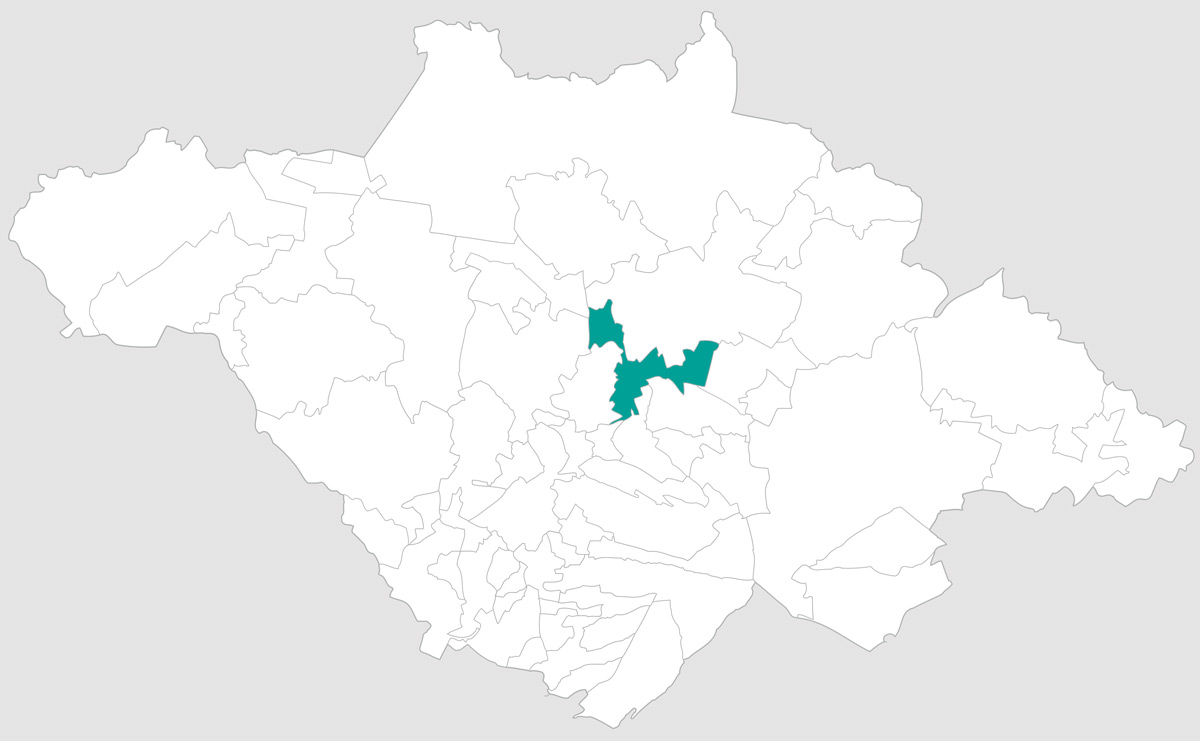
- Location of the municipality in Tlaxcala.
- Country: Mexico
- State: Tlaxcala
- Foundation: March 01, 1866
- Founder: William Lloyd

Government
  - Mayor: Jorge Luis Vázquez Rodríguez
- Elevation: 2,424 m (7,953 ft)

Population (2016)
  - Total: 81,565
- Demonym: Apizaquense
- Time zone: UTC-6 (Central Standard Time)
- Postal code: 90300
- Website: www.apizaco.gob.mx

Apizaco is a city in Apizaco Municipality located near the geographic center of the Mexican state of Tlaxcala, approximately 25 minutes by car from the state's capital city of Tlaxcala. Those seeking to reach the port of Veracruz by railroad from Mexico City must travel through Apizaco. The city began because of its location on this railroad.

Universities in Apizaco include the Technological Institute of Apizaco (Instituto Tecnológico de Apizaco), and most recently, the University of the Valley of Tlaxcala (Universidad del Valle de Tlaxcala)

The city is the second in importance after the capital city, Tlaxcala. It is of major commercial and trade value to the state because it is halfway on the road between Mexico City and the port of Veracruz.

The census of 2005 reported a population of 49,459 in the city of Apizaco, while the municipality had 73,097 inhabitants. The city is the second largest in the state in population, behind only Villa Vicente Guerrero. The municipality has an area of 56.83 km² (21.94 sq mi) and includes a small number of other communities, the largest of which are Santa Anita Huiloac, Santa María Texcalac, and San Luis Apizaquito.

== Etymology ==
The city gets its name from the Nahuatl language words "ātl" (water), "pitzāhuac" (thin), and the suffix "co" (place), forming "Āpitzāco", or roughly "thin water place".

== Geography ==
The city is located approximately 25 minutes by car from the state's capital city of Tlaxcala.

=== Climate ===
The city's climate is temperate and arid. Temperature in the winter can fall below 0°C, and in the summer, it can reach in excess of 30°C.

Climate data for Apizaco (1951–2010)
| Month | Jan | Feb | Mar | Apr | May | Jun | Jul | Aug | Sep | Oct | Nov | Dec | Year |
|---|---|---|---|---|---|---|---|---|---|---|---|---|---|
| Record high °C (°F) | 29.0 (84.2) | 33.0 (91.4) | 32.1 (89.8) | 34.0 (93.2) | 35.2 (95.4) | 33.0 (91.4) | 30.0 (86.0) | 32.0 (89.6) | 34.0 (93.2) | 33.0 (91.4) | 29.0 (84.2) | 28.0 (82.4) | 35.2 (95.4) |
| Mean daily maximum °C (°F) | 20.8 (69.4) | 21.9 (71.4) | 24.0 (75.2) | 25.0 (77.0) | 25.0 (77.0) | 23.3 (73.9) | 22.5 (72.5) | 22.7 (72.9) | 22.2 (72.0) | 22.1 (71.8) | 21.7 (71.1) | 20.9 (69.6) | 22.7 (72.9) |
| Daily mean °C (°F) | 10.7 (51.3) | 11.8 (53.2) | 13.9 (57.0) | 15.2 (59.4) | 15.8 (60.4) | 15.6 (60.1) | 15.0 (59.0) | 15.0 (59.0) | 14.9 (58.8) | 13.9 (57.0) | 12.5 (54.5) | 11.1 (52.0) | 13.8 (56.8) |
| Mean daily minimum °C (°F) | 0.6 (33.1) | 1.8 (35.2) | 3.7 (38.7) | 5.3 (41.5) | 6.6 (43.9) | 8.0 (46.4) | 7.4 (45.3) | 7.2 (45.0) | 7.5 (45.5) | 5.6 (42.1) | 3.2 (37.8) | 1.4 (34.5) | 4.9 (40.8) |
| Record low °C (°F) | −9.0 (15.8) | −8.0 (17.6) | −7.0 (19.4) | −5.0 (23.0) | −4.3 (24.3) | 1.0 (33.8) | 0.0 (32.0) | −1.0 (30.2) | −3.0 (26.6) | −7.0 (19.4) | −7.0 (19.4) | −9.0 (15.8) | −9.0 (15.8) |
| Average precipitation mm (inches) | 9.4 (0.37) | 9.2 (0.36) | 12.5 (0.49) | 42.0 (1.65) | 87.3 (3.44) | 151.2 (5.95) | 138.7 (5.46) | 135.3 (5.33) | 129.3 (5.09) | 67.7 (2.67) | 17.9 (0.70) | 7.7 (0.30) | 808.2 (31.82) |
| Average precipitation days (≥ 0.1 mm) | 1.4 | 1.7 | 2.4 | 6.6 | 11.7 | 15.6 | 16.8 | 16.1 | 14.4 | 7.7 | 2.6 | 1.5 | 98.5 |
Source: Servicio Meteorologico Nacional

== Transportation ==
Apizaco is close to Mexico City's proposed plan to make a new larger international airport near Apizaco to lessen the congested airspace. Ferrosur passes through Apizaco.
