= Tlaxcala =

State of Mexico

Tlaxcala Tlaxcallan (Nahuatl)
- State
- Free and Sovereign State of Tlaxcala; Estado Libre y Soberano de Tlaxcala (Spanish); Tlahtohcayotl Tlaxcallan (Nahuatl)
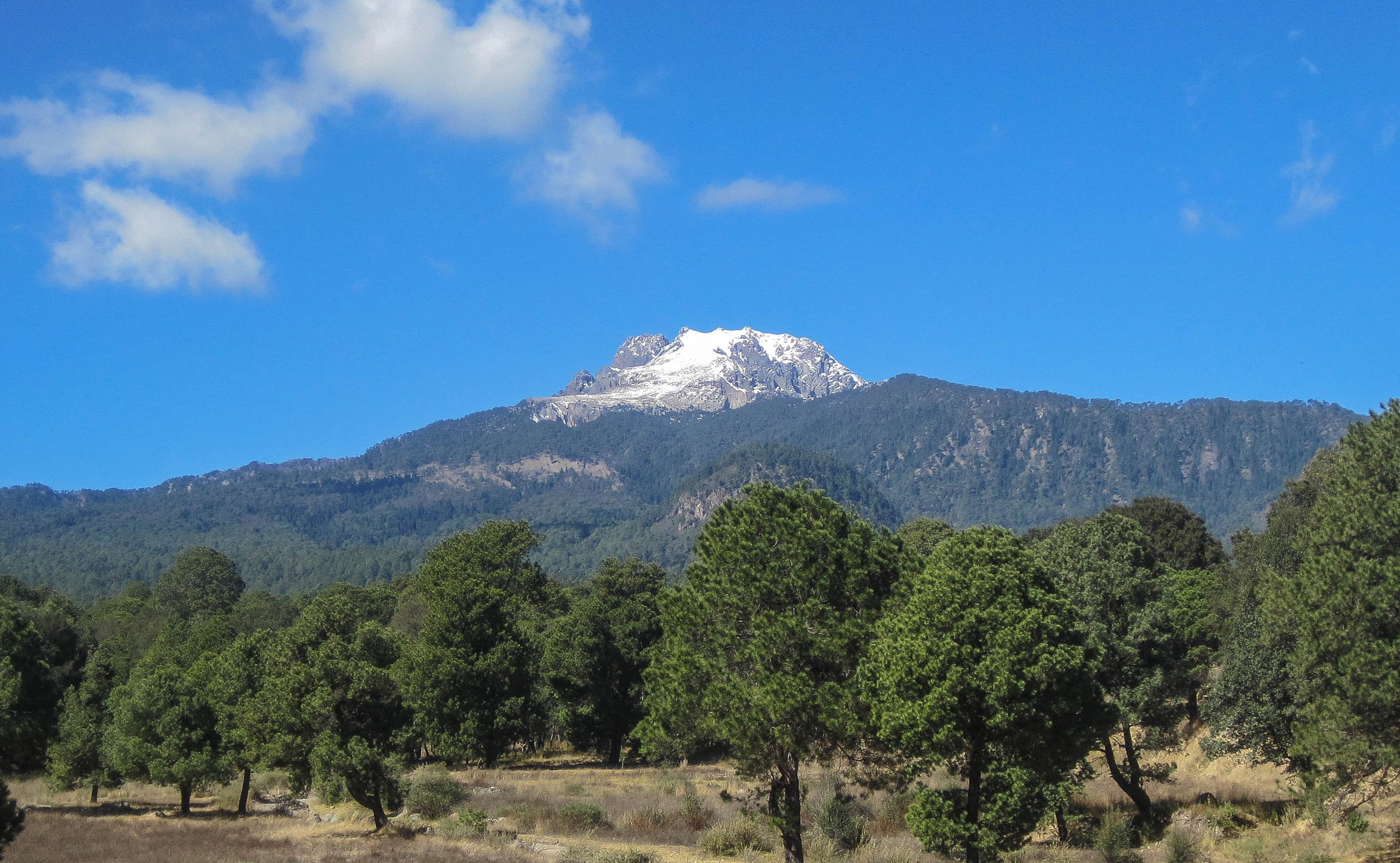
- View of Volcán Malinche

- Flag Coat of arms
- Motto: Cuna de la Nación (Cradle of the Nation)
- Anthem: Himno a Tlaxcala
- State of Tlaxcala within Mexico
- Coordinates: 19°26′N 98°10′W
- Country: Mexico
- Capital: Tlaxcala de Xicohténcatl
- Largest city: San Pablo del Monte
- Municipalities: 60
- Admission: December 9, 1856
- Order: 22nd

Government
  - Governor: Lorena Cuéllar (Morena)
  - Senators: Joel Molina Ramírez; Ana Lilia Rivera Rivera; Minerva Hernández Ramos
  - Deputies: Federal deputies: • Carlos Carreón Mejía; • Adriana Dávila Fernández; • Silvano Garay Ulloa; • Claudia Pérez Rodríguez; • José de la Luz Sosa Salinas; • Rubén Terán Águila

Area
  - Total: 4,016 km^{2} (1,551 sq mi)
- Ranked 31st
- Highest elevation (La Malinche): 4,420 m (14,500 ft)

Population (2020)
  - Total: 1,342,977
  - Rank: 28th
  - Density: 334.4/km^{2} (866.1/sq mi)
  - Rank: 3rd
- Demonym: Tlaxcalan

GDP
  - Total: MXN 158 billion (US$7.8 billion) (2022)
  - Per capita: US$5,594 (2022)
- Time zone: UTC−6 (Central)
- Postal code: 90
- Area code: Area codes 1 and 2: • 223; • 241; • 246; • 247; • 248; • 276; • 748; • 749
- ISO 3166 code: MX-TLA
- HDI: ▲0.782 high Ranked 21st of 32
- Website: Official website

Tlaxcala, (Note: UK: /tləˈskɑːlə, tlæˈ-/ tlə-SKAH-lə, tla-, US: /tlɑːˈ-/ tlah-; Spanish: [tla(ɣ)sˈkala]; from Nahuatl languages: Tlaxcallān [t͡ɬaʃˈkalːaːn̥]) officially the Free and Sovereign State of Tlaxcala, (Note: Spanish: Estado Libre y Soberano de Tlaxcala) is one of the 32 federal entities that comprise the Federal Entities of Mexico. It is divided into 60 municipalities and the capital city and the largest city is Tlaxcala de Xicohténcatl.

It is located in east-central Mexico, in the altiplano region, with the eastern portion dominated by the Sierra Madre Oriental. It is bordered by the states of Puebla to the north, east and south, México to the west and Hidalgo to the northwest. It is the smallest state of the republic, accounting for only 0.2% of the country's territory.

The state is named after its capital, Tlaxcala, which was also the name of the prehispanic polity. The Tlaxcaltec people allied themselves with the Spanish to defeat the Aztecs, with concessions from the Spanish that allowed the territory to remain mostly intact throughout 300 years of colonial period. After Mexican Independence, Tlaxcala was declared a federal territory, until 1857 when it was admitted as a state of the federation.

Most of the state's economy is based on agriculture, light industry and tourism. The tourist industry is rooted in Tlaxcala's long history with major attractions being archeological sites such as Cacaxtla and colonial constructions in and around the state capital.

== Name ==
The name Tlaxcala pre-dates the state by centuries; it derives from the name of the capital city, which was also used to denote the territory controlled by this city in pre-Hispanic times. According to some historians, the name comes from an ancient word texcalli (Classical Nahuatl pronunciation: [teʃˈkalːi]), which meant 'crag'; however, an alternative etymology stems from the Nahuatl word Tlaxcallān which means 'place of corn tortillas'. The Aztec glyph that referred to this place has both elements, two green hills and two hands holding a corn tortilla.

The letter 'x' in the name reflects the voiceless palato-alveolar fricative /ʃ/, a historical phoneme present in Nahuatl and in Old Spanish. The conquistadors transcribed this sound using that letter in the Spanish language at the time of colonization and also when codifying the alphabets of the indigenous languages in the Americas for the first time. Due to the evolution of the coronal fricatives that took place in Spanish during the 16th and 17th centuries, /ʃ/ transitioned into a voiceless velar fricative /x/ (similar to a strong 'H') at the beginning of a word or intervocalically, while it turned into a voiceless alveolar fricative /s/ at the end of a syllable. Thus, the pronunciation of Tlaxcala at the time of the sibilant shift transitioned from [tlaʃˈkala] to [tlasˈkala]. However, the realization [ˈtlaɣskala] is also present due to spelling pronunciation after the Spanish orthographic reform of 1815, which replaced the letter 'x' with 'j' in words that previously had /ʃ/ that transitioned into velar /x/, leaving the letter 'x' with the current pronunciation /ɡs/.

== Coat-of-arms ==
The state's coat of arms is based on the coat of arms that was granted to the city in 1535. Its different elements have the following meanings: the red background represents courage; the castle symbolizes defensive power; the eagle with its open wings represents the spirit of vigilance; the border symbolizes protection and compensation; the green palms stand for victory, and the crowns are the symbol of royal authority.

The letter I refers to Joanna of Castile, the mother of Charles I of Spain; the letter K (for Karl) represents the name of the king himself; and the letter F (for Felipe) belongs to Philip, later Philip II of Spain. The human skulls and cross-bones represent those who died during the Conquest.

== Geography ==
=== Political geography ===
The state of Tlaxcala is located slightly east of center of Mexico between 97°37′07″ and 98°42′51″W and 19°05′43″ and 19°44′07″N. It is bordered by the states of Hidalgo, Puebla and Mexico. It is the smallest state in terms of territory with only about 4,061 km^{2} (1,568 sq mi), representing about 0.2% of the entire country. The state is divided into 60 municipalities, the largest of which are Tlaxcala, Apizaco, Huamantla, Zacatelco, Calpulalpan, Chiautempan and Tlaxco. The political heart of the state is its capital, Tlaxcala, even though it is not the state's largest city. Tlaxcala lies at the foot of the northwestern slope of La Malinche volcano in the Sierra Madre Oriental. It is one of the oldest cities in Mexico, founded as an organized civilization before the 15th century. The Spanish political entity was founded by Hernán Cortés between 1520 and 1525 and given the Spanish name of New City of Our Lady of the Assumption. Its economy is still based on the traditional enterprises of agriculture, textiles, and the commerce of products of native peoples such as the Otomí, especially on market days. Other important cities include Santa Ana Chiautempan, the most populous city in the state, Apizaco, noted for its textile production and Huamantla, a farming and cattle town.

=== Natural geography and climate ===
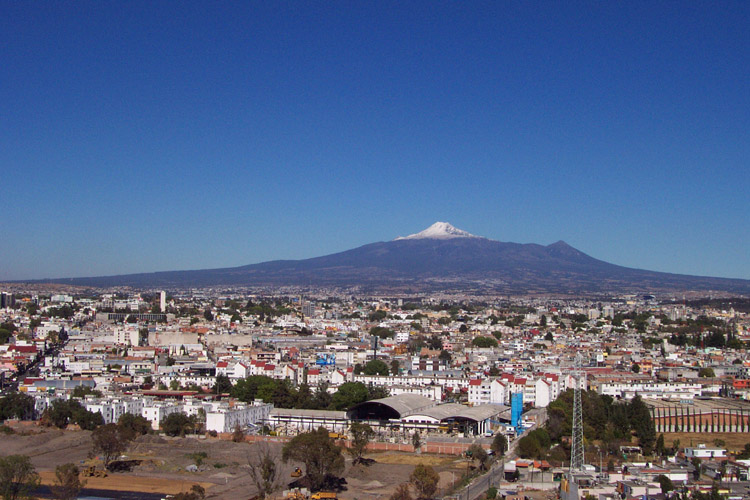
View of the La Malinche volcano

Tlaxcala is a land-locked state situated on the Trans-Mexican Volcanic Belt. The average altitude for the state is 2,230 meters above sea level, making it a bit higher than the Valley of Mexico just to the southwest. The western part of the state lies on the central plateau of Mexico while the east is dominated by the Sierra Madre Oriental, home of the 4,461 meter La Malinche volcano. Most of the state is rugged terrain dominated by ridges and deep valleys, along with protruding igneous rock formations. This ruggedness, along with large-scale weather phenomena such as the Intertropical Convergence Zone, gives the state a complex climate. Overall rain patterns for the state are about 400 mm (16 in) in the summer rainy season and 30 mm (1.2 in) in the winter. Locally, however, this varies dramatically between the drier plateaus and valleys and the wetter mountains. Variations in altitude produce sub-climates between semi-tropical to temperate, with frosts likely in the higher elevations during the winter. Temperate fir (Abies religiosa), juniper (Juniperus deppeana), and pine-oak forests dominate the mountain highlands, while the flatlands, with their drier climate, are characterized by agaves and prickly pear cactus (Opuntia).

The state has no major lakes or large rivers. The principal water sources are the Atoyac-Zahuapan basin and the reservoir of the Atlangatepec dam.

== Economy ==
=== Agriculture ===
Much of Tlaxcala's economy is based on agriculture, livestock and forestry. Principal crops for the state are maize and barley, along with important quantities of wheat, beans, animal feed and potatoes, using about 60% of the state's land. Although the state has 15 dams and 483 wells to provide water for agriculture, 88% of the state's agriculture is dependent on the summer rainy season, leaving it vulnerable to climatic phenomena such as El Niño or La Niña.

Most livestock raised in the state is beef cattle and dairy cows along with the renowned fighting bulls. Other important animals are pigs, sheep, horses, poultry and bees. About 35,842 hectares, or 6.7% of the state is dedicated to livestock. Due to the limited surface water, there is no commercial fishing or fish-farming here.

The state's forestry enterprises are located in the municipalities of Tlaxco, Terrenate, Altzayanca, Calpulalpan and Nanacamilpa, with about 35,842 hectares of land dedicated to this. However, the amount of land dedicated to forestry has been declining in recent years. To combat this, in 2007 2,484,687 trees were planted on about 2,477 hectares of land.

=== Industry and commerce ===
Light manufacturing has developed on a significant scale in the state, especially products produced for export outside the state. These products include clothing, foam and plastic products, paper products, publishing, textiles and automobile works. Organized industrial areas in the state include the Malinche Corridor, the Apizaco-Xalostoc-Huamantla Corridor, the Panzacola Corridor, the “industrial cities” of Xicohténcatli I, Xicohténcatli II and Xicohténcatli III, the industrial parks of Calpulalpan, Xiloxoxtla, Ixtacuixtla, and Nanacamilpa as well as the industrial areas of Velasco and Atlangatepec.

Most commercial activity in the state occurs in the municipalities of Apizaco, Chiautempan, Tlaxcala, Huamantla, San Pablo del Monte and Zacatelco. In the last economic census in 2003, INEGI registered 21,307 commercial establishments in the state, most of these being small individually or family-owned enterprises. There are also fifty-nine tianguis (tent markets which are movable), seventeen municipal markets, eleven malls, twenty-six department stores and fourteen commercial centers of other types. In addition, the state is an important link between Mexico's major eastern port, Veracruz, on the Gulf of Mexico, and Mexico City, in the interior.

=== Tourism ===
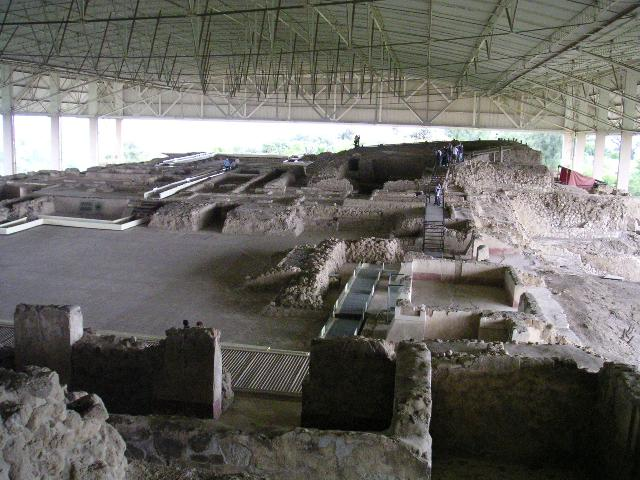
View of the ruins at Cacaxtla

Tourist attractions primarily consist of pre-Hispanic archaeological sites and colonial establishments, with examples of both religious and civil constructions. However, in comparison with the rest of Mexico, Tlaxcala's archaeological and colonial sites are barely known. Tlaxcala's major attractions are the archaeological sites of Cacaxtla, Xochitécatl and Tizatlán, which were not fully investigated until the 20th century, unlike most sites within the state. When Hernán Cortés came, Mesoamerican civilization here was considered to be in the Post-Classic stage, and the kingdom was filled with temples, palaces and grand plazas that impressed the Spaniards.

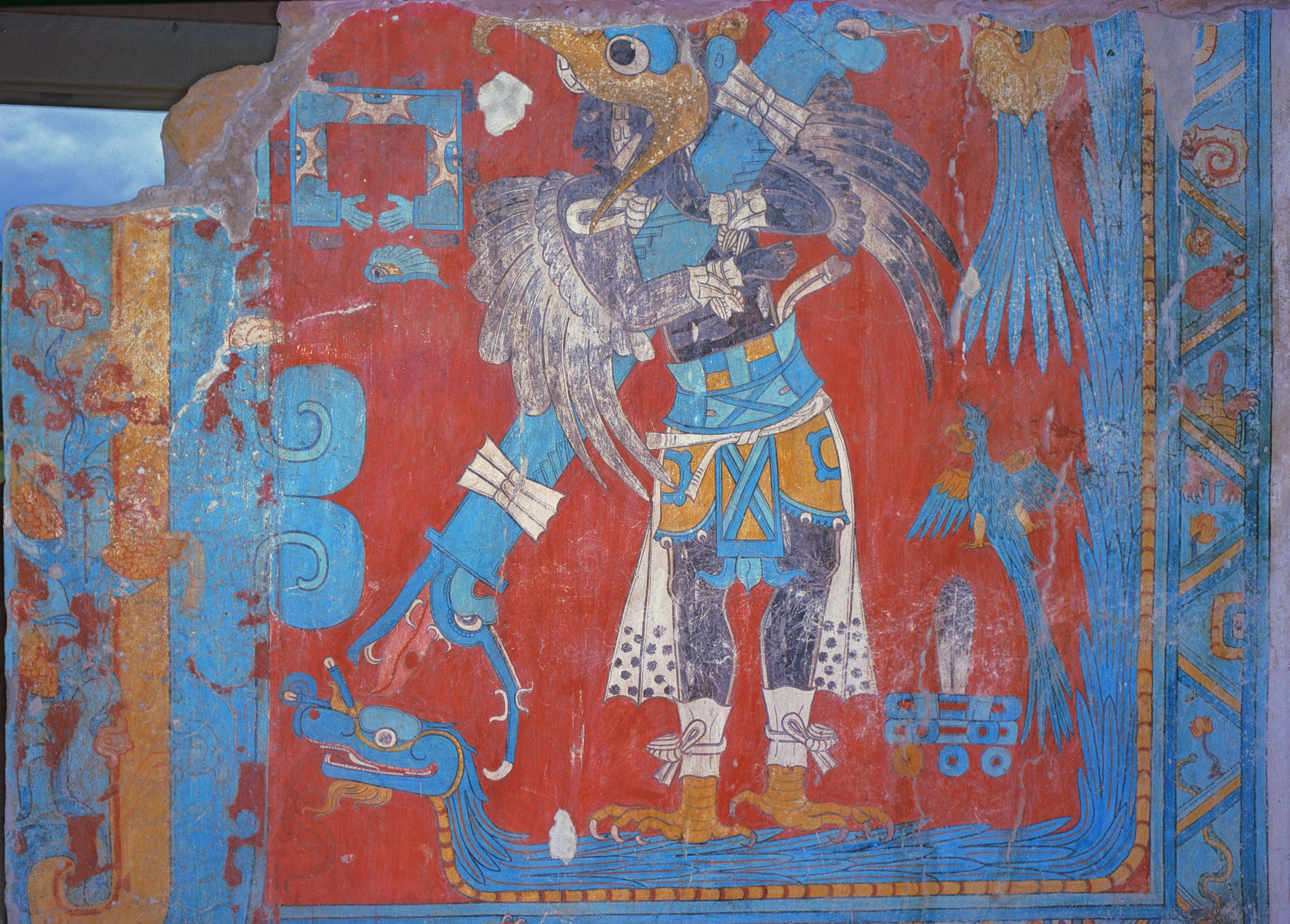
One of the murals at Cacaxtla

Tlaxcala's two major archaeological sites are Xochitécatl and Cacaxtla. Xochitécatl was built between 300 and 400 A.D., and probably reached its peak between 600 and 800 A.D. There is evidence that occupation of the sites extends much further back in time than the early city's known habitation. The ceremonial center is situated on a hill with four main structures called "The Spiral Building," "The Volcano Base," "The Serpent Pyramid" and "The Flower Pyramid." The last is the most important, and is topped by two monolithic pillars. This pyramid is the fourth largest in Mexico (by base size), and the Spiral Pyramid is one of the few circular ones ever to be found.

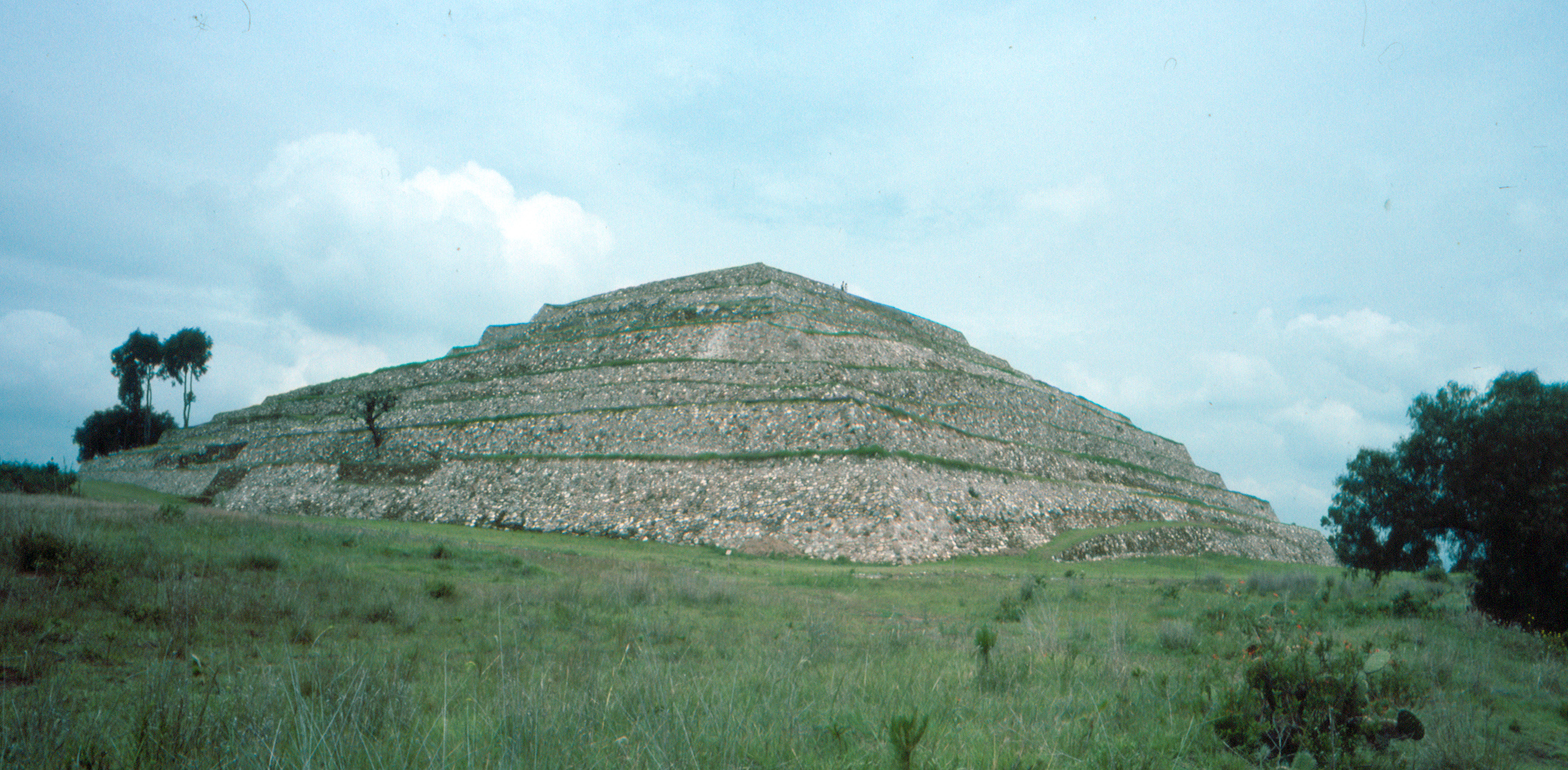
The Flower Pyramid at Xochitécatl

Cacaxtla was built later than Xochitécatl, between 600 and 900 A.D., and is the far larger of the two. It was only re-discovered in 1975, by farmers from the nearby town of San Miguel del Milagro, who began discovering archaeological artifacts in the fields. The main attractions here are the murals, painted with pigments sourced from local minerals. Some of the best works include the Scorpion Man at the Venus Temple, Cacaxtli with corn plant at the Red Temple, the Battle Mural (which is 22 meters long, portraying 48 human figures), and the Bird Man and the Jaguar Man found in "Porch A."

Another interesting archeological site is called Tizatlán. This site does not contain pyramids; instead the buildings here are made of adobe brick, a very unusual construction material for this place and time. The site contains two stucco-covered altars with murals that follow the Borgia Group codex style with images of gods and important human figures, including gods such as Tezcatlipoca, Tlaloc and Mayahuel and were the scene of human sacrifices.

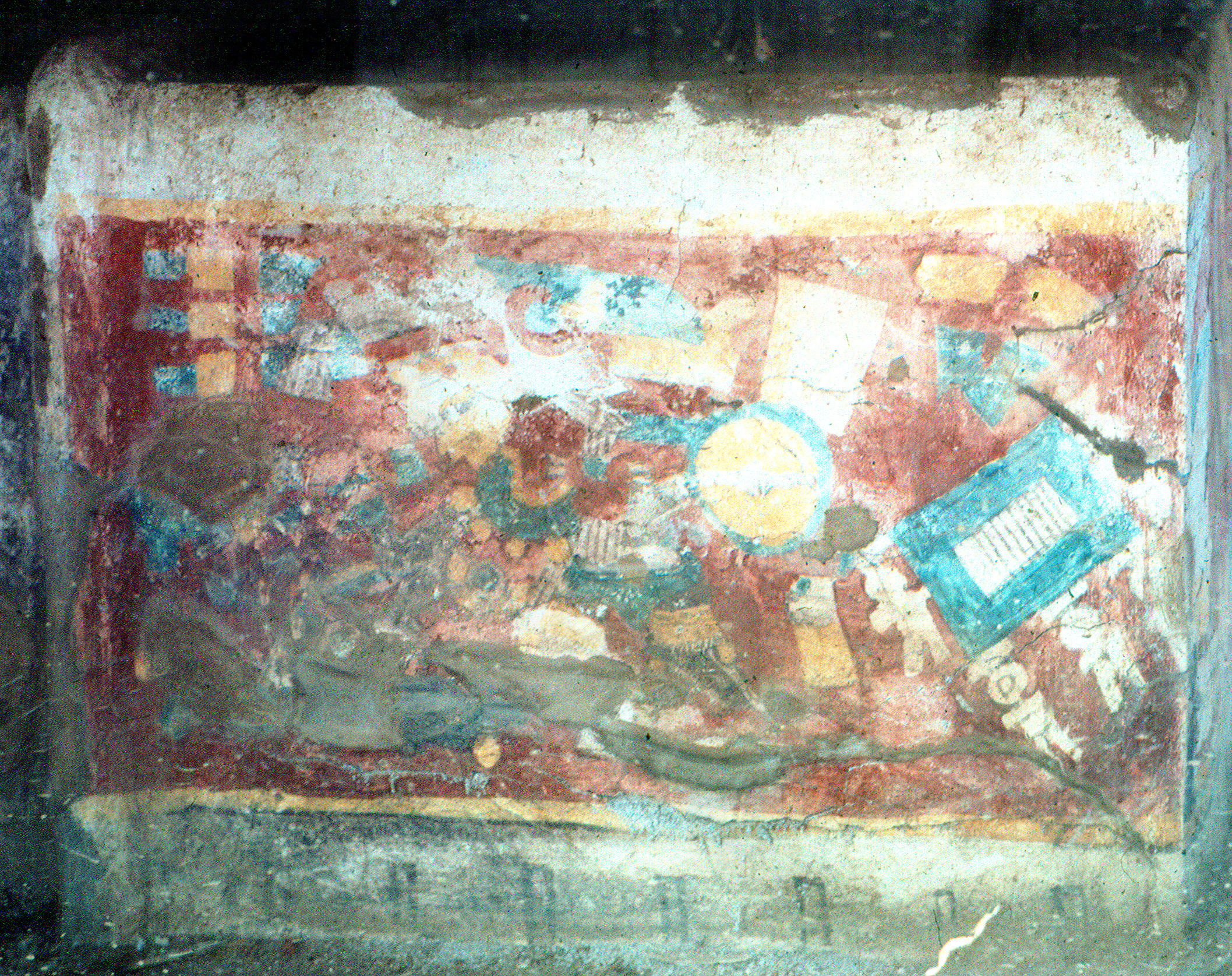
Mural at Tizatlan

The state contains more than 1,000 archeological sites with only seven fully excavated and open to the public. The last of these is Ocotelulco, situated on a hill near the town of San Francisco Ocotelulco. It is a collection of dwellings with raised areas for ceremonial purposes. Its altar is similar to the one found at Tezcatlipoca, decorated with colorful frescos with images of Quetzalcoatl, Xolotl and Tlahuizcalpantecuhtli. These images are in the style of the Post-classic period and have been dated to about 1450. Tlaxcala is home to some of the earliest colonial architecture and art. The oldest church in Mexico, built in 1521 and the first monasteries, built by the Franciscans, were built here in 1524. Many other churches and monasteries were built in the state in the 16th and early 17th centuries. Just about every municipality has colonial-era structures such as churches, municipal palaces and plazas but the best examples are in and around the city of Tlaxcala. The Temple and Ex-monastery of San Francisco, built in the early 16th century, is located about 14 km southeast of the capital city. Only the church retains its original function; the former monastery now houses a school. The State Government Palace is located in the city proper and was creating by conjoining the former mayor's house, the treasury and the state warehouse, which is architecturally held together with a Plateresque facade. The city's cathedral, called Nuestra Señora de la Asunción, built in the 16th century. Its main altar preserves a Baroque altarpiece with a depiction of the baptism of the Lord Maxixcatzin, with Hernán Cortés and Malinche as godparents. A bit later, the Basilica of Ocotlán was built in the 17th and 18th centuries to comply with a demand of the Virgin Mary who reportedly appeared before Juan Diego Bernardino here in 1541. It is considered be the culmination of the Baroque style in Tlaxcala. The state also contains 140 haciendas, which vary in their state of conservation but some are promoted for tourism.

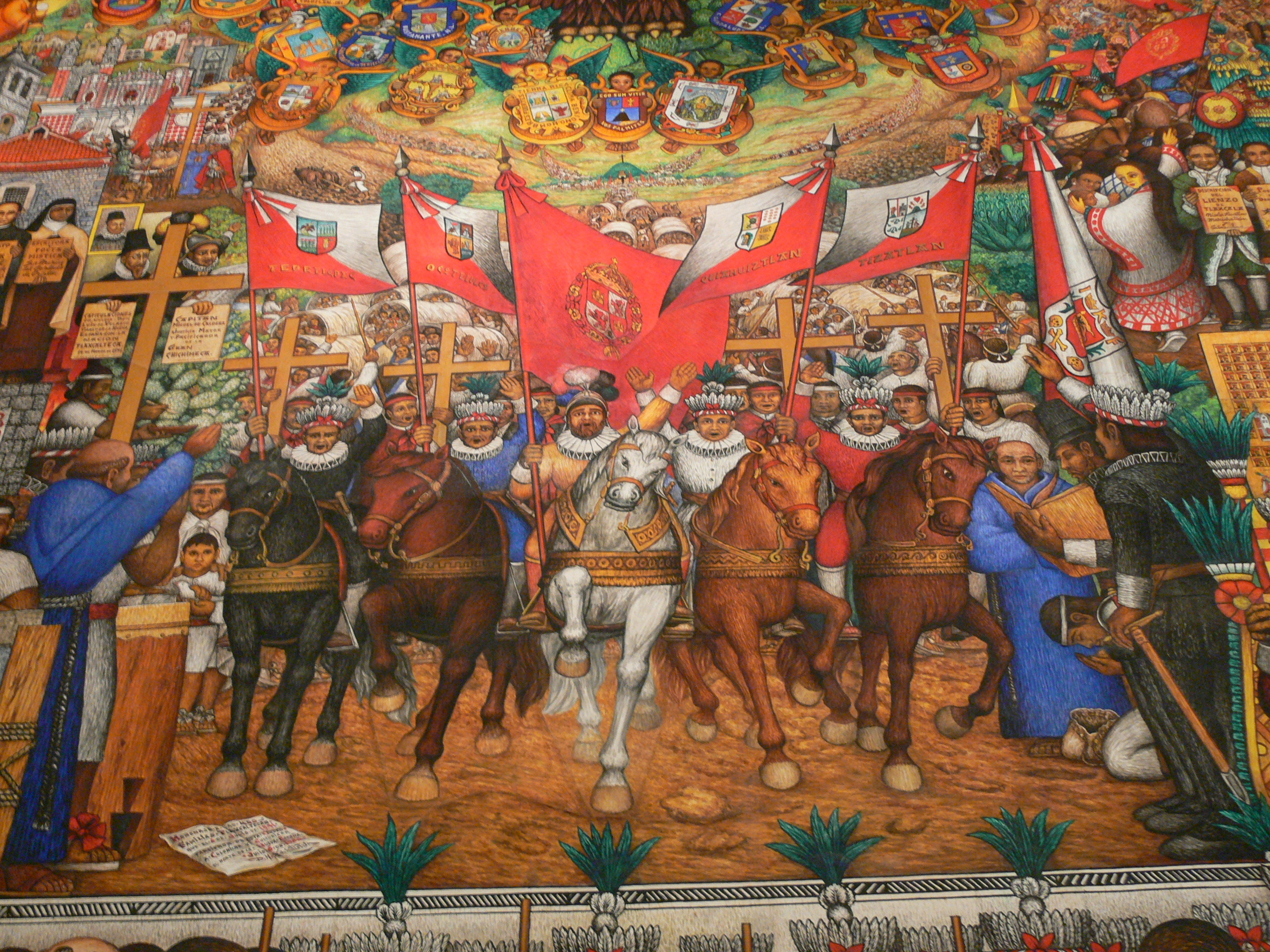
The Tlaxcala flag was painted by Desiderio Hernández Xochitiotzin in the interior of the State Government Palace

Regional festivals here are known for dances featuring men in mustached masks (imitating Spaniards), large-plumed hats and colorful garb. This is especially apparent during Carnival, when over 4,000 folk dancers from different villages come to the capital to celebrate. In a village just north of the capital, in San Juan Totolac, every year they commemorate the departure of 400 families in 1591 who went north to colonize the land known as the Gran Chichimeca, which primarily covers the northeast of modern Mexico. Streets in Huamantla are decorated with flowers in intricate designs on "La Noche que Nadie Duerme" (The Night No One Sleeps) in August. Many other festivals are in the state, many of which display the state's long tradition of bullfighting.

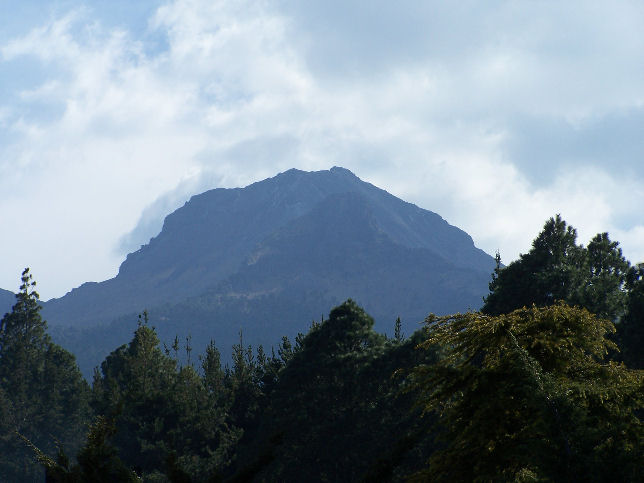
View of La Malinche volcano

Ecotourism is relatively new here and much of it centers on La Malinche National Park, home to the La Malinche volcano, which is 4,461 m (14,636 ft) high. Here one can camp, mountain bike, horseback ride, rappel and climb the volcano itself. At the peak of La Malinche, it is possible to see the volcanos of Popocatépetl, Iztaccíhuatl (in Puebla/Mexico State) and Pico de Orizaba (Veracruz).

Ninety five percent of those visiting Tlaxcala are from Mexico and most of these are from neighboring Puebla. Foreign visitors are mostly German, French and Swiss who are interested in Mexican history.

=== Sex trade and human trafficking ===
Tenancingo, a town in Tlaxcala, is the beginning of a pipeline in an illicit, international trafficking trade, and considered to be the center for sex trafficking in Mexico. Roots of the practice of sex trafficking date back to the 1960s. An unnamed Mexican charity told the BBC that it estimated of the 10,000 inhabitants of Tenancingo, 1,000 are sex traffickers. Sexual exploitation, human trafficking, and pimping are a major source of income for the town, although an exact dollar amount is not known. These practices have been denounced by three NGOs. Modern-day investigations (as well as the 2014 documentary "Pimp City: A Journey to the Center of the Sex Trade") by the US Department of Justice have revealed Tenancingo to be a hub for providing female sex slaves to the United States. According to the documentary, the entire political structure and police force of the town are implicated in human trafficking and the sex trade.

== Demographics ==
Largest cities or towns in Tlaxcala Source:
Rank		Municipality	Pop.
1	San Pablo del Monte	San Pablo del Monte	70,244
2	Huamantla	Huamantla	59,871
3	Chiautempan	Chiautempan	53,373
4	Apizaco	Apizaco	49,506
5	Zacatelco	Zacatelco	45,587
6	Calpulalpan	Calpulalpan	37,704
7	Contla	Contla de Juan Cuamatzi	30,417
8	Papalotla	Papalotla de Xicohténcatl	28,657
9	Ocotlán	Tlaxcala	24,342
10	Teolocholco	Teolocholco	19,147

Historical population
Year	Pop.	±%
1895	168,358	—
1900	172,315	+2.4%
1910	184,171	+6.9%
1921	178,570	−3.0%
1930	205,458	+15.1%
1940	224,063	+9.1%
1950	284,551	+27.0%
1960	346,699	+21.8%
1970	420,638	+21.3%
1980	556,597	+32.3%
1990	761,277	+36.8%
1995	883,924	+16.1%
2000	962,646	+8.9%
2005	1,068,207	+11.0%
2010	1,169,936	+9.5%
2015	1,272,847	+8.8%
2020	1,342,977	+5.5%

Tlaxcala is the smallest and one of the most densely populated of the states of Mexico. The state comprises only 0.2% of the nation's territory, but had a population of 1,068,207 in 2005. Population density ranges from 50 people/km^{2} in the rural municipality of Atlangatepec to 269 people/km^{2} in the city of Tlaxcala.

The largest population centers are Tlaxcala, Huamantla, Apizaco, San Pablo del Monte, Zacatelco and Chiautempan, whose 361,328 inhabitants represent over 33% of the state's population. However, the largest population increases are occurring in the municipalities of Tzompamtepec, Yauhquemecan, and Santa Isabel Xiloxoxtla. Of Tlaxcala's 60 municipalities, ten have a poverty index rating of "very low", twenty-nine have a rating of "low", seventeen have a ranking of "medium" and only four have a ranking of "high".

According to data through the II Census of Population and Housing conducted by the National Institute of Statistics and Geography (INEGI) with census date of 12 June 2010, the state of Tlaxcala until this year had a total of 1,169,936 inhabitants; of that number, 565,775 were men and 604,161 were women. The annual growth rate for the entity during the period 2005-2010 was 1.8%.

The average size of households in the state is 4.3, while the national level is 3.9, according to the 2010 population census, however, by municipality varies from 3.8 to 5 persons per household.

In the same year (2010) on average in the state of Tlaxcala 293 people per square kilometer, while nationally there are 57 people per square kilometer. Until that year 78% of the population lives in urban areas and 22% in rural, data also the II Census of Population and Housing conducted by the National Institute of Statistics and Geography (INEGI) in 2010.

== History ==
The area known as Tlaxcala has officially been a number of different entities, from an indigenous kingdom during the Pre-Columbian era, a district of the colonial Viceroyalty of New Spain, a territory of the Republic of Mexico, and finally a "free and sovereign" state in Mexico. Tlaxcalans consider their fight to remain a distinct entity a hallmark of their history, resisting in turn the Aztecs, the Spanish colonial government, the various monarchies and republics of an independent Mexico, and even the claims on its territory by its neighboring state of Puebla.

=== Pre-Columbian ===
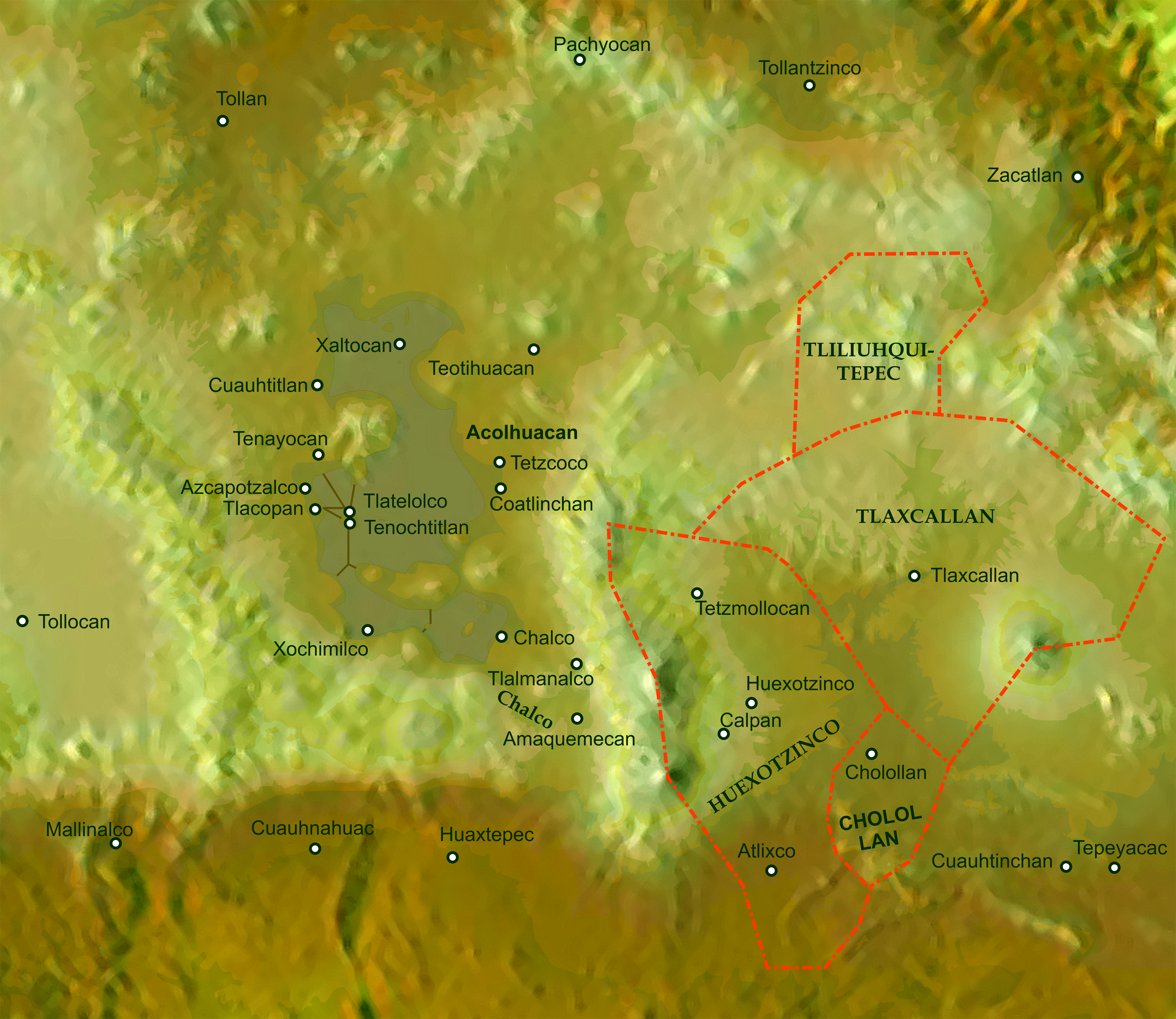
Map showing location of Tlaxcallan kingdom

Evidence of human occupation in what is now the state of Tlaxcala extends back to 12,000 BCE, with the earliest identified cultures being Tzompantepec (1700–1200 BCE), Tlatempa (1200–800 BCE), and Texoloc (800–400 BCE). The Toltecs also had a presence, but the first major native culture here was the Olmeca-Xicallanca. This civilization fell into decline after 900 AD and was replaced by a sub-group of the Chichimecas. In the 14th century, the Chichimecas were driven out by the Tlaxcaltec, a Nahua people and the indigenous ethnicity that still dominates the state. The Tlaxcalans founded the city of Tlaxcala and then began to subdue the surrounding peoples. Eventually, the Tlaxcalan nation would evolve into a confederation of four sub-states called Tepectipac, Ocotelulco, Tizatlán and Quiahuixtlán.

The pre-Columbian Tlaxcalan state developed roughly at the same time as another Nahua people, the Mexica, were building the vast Aztec Empire with its capital at Tenochtitlan. From the 14th century, these two nations were in near constant state of war. However, even though the Aztecs managed to build the largest empire in Mesoamerica, they never did conquer Tlaxcala. By the time the Spanish arrived in the 16th century, Tlaxcala was an independent enclave nearly completely surrounded by the Aztec Empire. This left Tlaxcala economically isolated, leaving it without goods such as cotton and salt. This and the constant warfare with the Mexica would give the Tlaxcalans reasons to ally with the Spanish.

=== Spanish era ===
==== Conquest ====
"It is more inhabited than other provinces; and its inhabitants, who are the least oppressed of any in New Spain, owe this favour to the alliance that their republican ancestors made with the disciplined robbers whom Cortés commanded, and who subdued the Mexican empire. They are the most intelligent of all the Americans subject to Spain."

— Thomas Kitchin, The Present State of the West-Indies: Containing an Accurate Description of What Parts Are Possessed by the Several Powers in Europe, 1778

When Hernán Cortés and the Spanish landed on the Veracruz coast, they were greeted by the Totonacas, who were a subject people of the Aztecs and saw the Spanish as a way to free themselves of rule from Tenochtitlan. They allied with the Spanish, and when Cortés decided to go inland to Tenochtitlan, the Totonacas guided them to other subject peoples who would be willing to ally with them, including and especially the Tlaxcalans. However, after entering Tlaxcalan territory, the Spanish were met by a hostile Tlaxcalan force of 30,000. The Tlaxcalans fought the Spanish and their indigenous allies in a number of battles, with the Spanish inflicting heavy casualties on the Tlaxcalans despite their superior numbers. The Spaniards' prowess in battle impressed the Tlaxcalan King Xīcohtēncatl Āxāyacatzin, who then not only allowed the Spanish to pass through his territory, but also invited them into the capital city of Tlaxcala.

Cortés stayed in the city of Tlaxcala for 20 days and forged an alliance with the Tlaxcalans to bring down Tenochtitlan. Cortes added 6,000 Tlaxcala warriors to his ranks and arrived to Tenochtitlan in November 1519. They were received by Emperor Moctezuma II, who understood the potential danger of a Spanish-Tlaxcalan alliance. Despite initial friendliness, intrigue and siege of the capital followed, with the Aztec backlash sending Cortes' very wounded army limping back to Tlaxcalan territory. The Tlaxcalan king gave the Spanish refuge but promised further assistance in the conquest of Tenochtitlan only under certain conditions including perpetual exemption from tribute of any sort, part of the spoils of war, and control of two provinces that bordered Tlaxcala. Cortés agreed. Cortes and the Tlaxcalans returned to Tenochtitlan in December 1520. After many battles, including street-by-street fighting in Tenochtitlan itself, the Aztec Empire fell in August 1521.

==== Colonial period ====
Historian Charles Gibson published (1952) a path breaking study of Tlaxcala, from the indigenous viewpoint. He particularly focused on ways that the Tlaxcalans shaped the polity's history for its own advantage, and how the four-part organization of the polity was maintained during the early colonial era. A particularly important source for the early colonial history of Tlaxcala is a set of records in the indigenous language of Nahuatl, now published as The Tlaxcalan Actas. These town council records are a type of indigenous language source used by scholars in the field known as the New Philology. James Lockhart drew on these materials in his study The Nahuas After the Conquest For the most part, the Spanish kept their promise to the Tlaxcalans. Unlike Tenochtitlan and other cities, Tlaxcala was not destroyed after the Conquest. They also allowed many Tlaxcalans to retain their indigenous names. The Tlaxcalans were mostly able to keep their traditional form of government. For 300 years of colonial Viceroyalty of New Spain rule, the Spanish mostly held true to the Tlaxcalans' conditions of 1520.

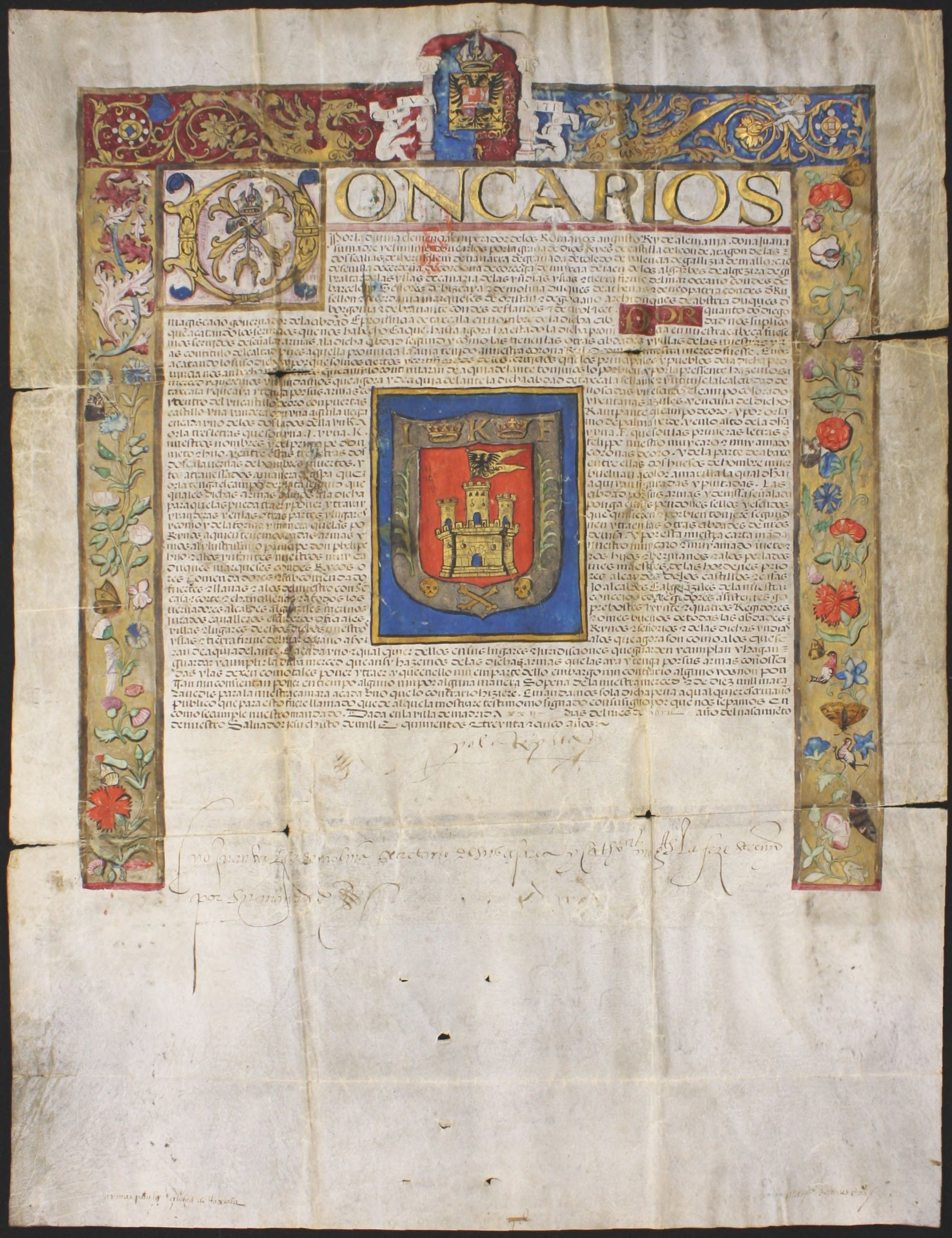
Decree issued by Charles V, conferring a coat of arms for Tlaxcala, and the title of "Loyal City" in recognition of the services "which the noblemen and towns of the said province have accomplished for us", which was one of only 3 such titles given by the Emperor to cities in New Spain.

One of the major cultural interventions, however, was the evangelization of the region. Franciscan friars arrived in 1524. They built monasteries and churches and renamed the city of Tlaxcala "Nuestra Señora de la Asunción." The first archbishopric of New Spain was established here. Most of the conversion work was done by 1530. In 1535, the city of Tlaxcala received its coat-of-arms from the Spanish king. Unlike the rest of Mexico, Tlaxcala was under the direct protection of the Spanish crown, part of its reward for its support in the Conquest. This shielded the Tlaxcalans from the worst of the oppression of the native peoples, which reached its peak in the 1530s. In fact, Tlaxcalan allegiance to the Spaniards became an enduring partnership. Tlaxcalan forces joined Spanish forces to put down revolts such as the Mixtón Rebellion and accompanied them to conquer places such as Guatemala and northern Mexico.

In the late 16th century, Christianized and sedentary Tlaxcalans were recruited to settle and pacify the Chichimecas in what is now northeast Mexico. Tlaxcalans were used not only to fight but also to establish towns in villages in this nomadic people's territory, to be a kind of example to them. Over 400 Tlaxcalan families would move north, but not until they negotiated and won special concessions from the Spanish. They included orders called "mandamientos de amparo" to ensure that these families' heirs would not lose the lands that were being granted to them. They also included freedom from tributes, taxes and personal service in perpetuity. These settlers were instrumental in pacifying this part of Mexico, and although these families eventually intermarried with the Chichimeca, they never completely lost their Tlaxcalan identity.

During the colonial period, the Tlaxcalans were successful in keeping the concessions granted to them by the Spanish crown. In 1585, when the territory of Tlaxcala was formally established, it roughly had the same borders as the old Tlaxcalan state. While the neighboring territory of Puebla had some authority over this territory, the city of Tlaxcala remained independently governed until Mexican Independence in 1821.

However, the indigenous population who had been living in Tlaxcala were somehow reduced to a small minority. Tlaxcala in 1519 had a population estimated at 150,000 to 500,000, the larger estimate perhaps including allies, such as those in the adjacent Pueblo valley. According to Catholic Encyclopedia, in 1625 the formerly sizeable city of Tlaxcala had only 700 people. The decline in the population was due to epidemics, emigrations, and the construction of a canal which served the Mexican Valley.

=== Post-independence era ===
After victory in the Mexican War of Independence and the end of the First Mexican Empire with the 1824 Constitution of Mexico, on November 24, 1824, Tlaxcala was declared a federal territory, Tlaxcala Territory. Tlaxcala was finally admitted as a state of the federation on December 9, 1856. The state was subdivided into five provinces, but had roughly the same dimensions, but somewhat less than before. Later, the state was able to recover some of that lost territory when the region known as Calpulapan was reunited in the 1860s. The state was governed from 1885 to 1911 by Próspero Cahuantzi, one of the few Mexicans of indigenous origin to be a state governor.

== Cuisine ==
The cuisine of the state is similar to that of neighboring Hidalgo, Puebla and Mexico City, featuring dishes such as barbacoa, mixiote, tamales, tacos, cemitas, quesadillas and more. The state is known for the use of a number of ingredients in these dishes. One of these is the use of a number of edible insects, many of which are considered delicacies, such as escamoles (ant eggs) and maguey larvae, as well as others locally known as padrecitos, mecapales, toritos and tenanas. Vegetable items include a wide variety of mushrooms (often harvested from the wild), squash flowers, chilacayote, xoconostle (a kind of cactus fruit), nopal and epazote. Like neighboring Puebla, moles are an important element, especially for dishes made for special occasions. Two local versions include mole prieto and mole de ladrillo.

== Education ==
The formal state educational system of the state accommodates only 53% of eligible schoolchildren. Almost all of the rest are schooled in pre-schools, indigenous educational systems and other centers. Primary and secondary education is mostly provided by the state Secretary of Education. Indigenous education is a system of preschools and primary schools which meet the cultural demands of indigenous populations of the state. These are largely located in the municipalities of Ixtenco, Contla de Juan C., San Pablo del Monte, Teolocholco, Tetlanohcan and la Magdalena.

High school and vocational education is provided by state school systems named CBTIS, CETIS, CECYTE, CBTA, COBAT, and CONALEP. Most of these schools are of the vocational type. Higher education is provided by both public and prívate institutions, with the most important of these being the Universidad Autónoma de Tlaxcala (UAT), which also offers the widest range of majors. Other public universities and colleges include the Instituto Tecnológico de Apizaco, Instituto Tecnológico Agropecuario de Xocoyucan, Escuela Normal Estatal Lic. Benito Juárez, and the Universidad Tecnológica de Tlaxcala. Private institutions include the Universidad del Valle, Universidad de Calpulalpan, Instituto Tecnológico de Tlaxcala and UPAEP Tlaxcala.

In addition to traditional centers of education there are state-run technical training centers, which are considered to be an educational priority for Tlaxcala. These centers train people with short courses with industrial or trade skills. Some of these centers include the Centro de Capacitación Tecnológica Industrial (CECATI) and the Instituto de capacitación para el Trabajo en Tlaxcala (ICATLAX).

The state also has a library system with 129 public libraries located in 59 municipalities, with a collection of 588,758 volumes.

== Media ==
Newspapers of Tlaxcala include: El Sol de Tlaxcala, and Síntesis, El Periódico de Tlaxcala.

== See also ==
- Estado de México
