= Handcrafts and folk art in Tlaxcala =

Artistic traditions of Tlaxaca, Mexico

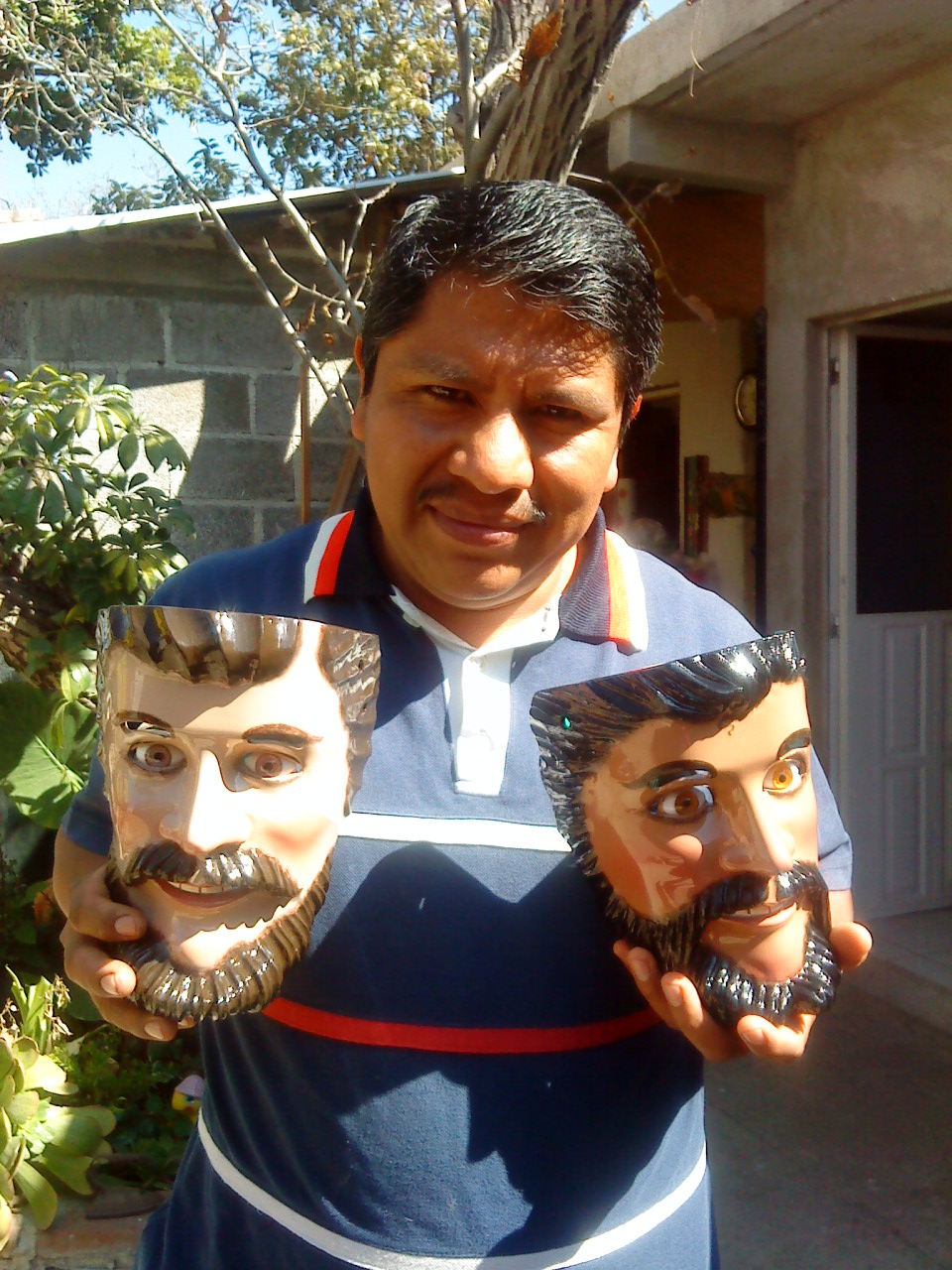
Tlaxcalan artisan with traditional artisan masks

Tlaxcala handcrafts and folk art is that which comes from the smallest state in Mexico, located in the center-east of the country. Its best-known wares are the "canes of Apizaco" (really from San Esteban Tizatlan), sawdust carpets and the making of Saltillo-style serapes. However, there are other handcraft traditions, such as the making of pottery, including Talavera type wares, cartoneria, metalworking and stone working. The state supports artisans through the activities of the Fideicomiso Fondo de la Casa de las Artesanía de Tlaxcala (Handcrafts House of Tlaxcala Fund and Trust)

== Socioeconomic significance ==
Tlaxcala is Mexico's smallest and most densely populated entity outside of the Mexico City metropolitan area. A significant portion of the state's handcraft production is done in small villages, and in indigenous communities such as Ixtenco, San Isidro Buensuceso and Tetlahnocan. There are two crafts that are best known from the state, the making of ephemeral sawdust carpets for certain religious celebrations, especially in Huamantla and the making of wooden canes in San Esteban Tizatlán. However, there are a variety of crafts made in the state from textiles, to pottery to stone work and more. Much of which has not been widely documented.

The state entity charged with promoting and preserving Tlaxcalan handcrafts is the Fideicomiso Fondo de la Casa de las Artesanía de Tlaxcala (Handcrafts House of Tlaxcala Fund and Trust). It established and runs the Museo Vivo de Artes y Tradiciones Populares del Estado (Living Museum of Folk Arts and Traditions), located in a former state office building. Its main objective is to document the development and status of the state's handcraft traditions. Its permanent collection is in six halls and includes a Child Jesus of ayacahuite wood, with glass eyes and movable limbs; various articles for the making of pulque, Otomi traditional garb, pottery and musical instruments called salterios. It also has exhibits dedicated to various traditions and celebrations.

The Trust also sponsored contests for state artisans, such as the Concurso Estatal de Arte Popular Tlaxcala (Tlaxcala State Folks Art Contest), as well as a "Day of the Artisan" in late June. There are also handcraft exhibitions at the annual Feria de Tlaxcala (Tlaxcala State Fair). Santa Ana Chiautempan hosts the annual National Serape Fair in late July.

In 2015, the governor of the state traveled to Rome to promote the state's handcrafts to the Vatican.

== Wood working ==
Modern work working techniques were introduced by the Spanish, and along with furniture, a number of smaller wood items are made.

The best known wood item is a kind of walking cane which is made in the town of San Esteban Tizatlan. Despite the origin, these canes are generally known as the "walking canes of Apizaco" because the arrival of the railroad to this town allowed their marketing in the larger city, popularizing them. Characteristic of these canes is the carving, which is complemented by different colors of wood and varnish and sometimes burning to add decorative motifs, which are often of pre Hispanic origin. Today, about eighty families depending on woodworking for a living, but the popularity of the canes has made the tlaxistle tree (Amelanchier denticulata), from which they are traditionally made, to become endangered. This has prompted a switch to sabine (sp. Juniperus) wood, but it is not as flexible and requires that the head be worked separately from the body. In addition to the canes, the town makes wooden bats, decorated in a similar fashion, and items of cedar and ayacahuite such as toys, chess sets, letter openers, furniture and religious figures for altars. Another important item is drum called teponaxtle, made from a hollowed log.

In San Pablo Apetatitlán, there is a neighborhood called Tlatempa, noted for the making of religious figures from ayacahuite, with glass eyes and movable extremities. They are also noted for the making of traditional masks for Carnival and other festivities. These masks generally portray Europeans as Carnival was a time that allowed the indigenous to poke fun of the conquistadors. One noted family for this work is that of Pedro Reyes, which has made these masks for generations. The men shape the wood and the women paint and decorate. Each mask takes about 26 hours of work, making its price above what poor people can pay. Mostly of European faces for dances such as the Huehues. Jesus Tlatempan is also noted for the making of wood masks for Carnival and religious images which are painted in oils.

The capital of the state has a neighborhood called Santiago Atlzayanca which makes furniture along with a stringed musical instrument called a salterios, a medieval instrument introduced by the Spanish. Calpulapan also makes musical instruments, generally of ebony, oak, walnut and other hard woods. The most common instruments are guitars, violins, vihuelas and requintos.

== Textiles ==
Textiles in the state have a history that dates back well into the pre Hispanic period, and which was well-developed before the arrival of the Spanish. These textiles had complicated designs and were dyed in various colors using resources such as cochineal and a purple dye made from snails from Oaxaca. The best of these were generally made as offerings to the gods. The Spanish introduced the working of new materials such as wool and silk. In the late colonial period into the era of the railroad, textile production consolidated onto haciendas then factories, a number of which became known for their work such as La Trinidad, San Luis, Santa Elena and La Estrella. However, the development of industrial textiles production never completely displaced more traditional methods.

The best known handcrafts of the state are the textiles produced in the villages around Santa Ana Chiautempan and San Bernardino Contla, which are marketed through Santa Ana. These are made in family workshops which may have pedal looms or more modern electric looms. Commercial dyes are used as well as some natural dyes such as those made from indigo and walnut. Many of these products are sold on the beaches and other tourist attractions of Mexico, as well as in the state itself. These wares include serapes, rebozos, sweaters of a design called Chiconcuac, jackets, capes, gloves and hats made of wool. The most traditional and high-quality pieces are made from 100% wool, generally made to order, but most of the rest of the production has deteriorated, with the substitution of synthetic fibers for some of all of the wool or cotton. The most recognizable product is the Saltillo-style serape, despite the state's distance from this northern Mexican city. The reason for this was that the Spanish resettled many Tlaxcalan indigenous families north to help with the colonization process. Both Santa Ana Chiautempan and San Bernardino Contla make them, and generally are of wool or cotton.

One notable artisan from just outside Santa Ana Chiautempan is Guadalupe Ixcotla, who specializes not in weaving, but in the creation of hand-knitted tapestries, made on vertical frames. These works generally have landscape motifs.

San Juan Ixtenco is noted for its pepenado embroidery, which consists of fine points arranged to form figures, especially on blouses. These can be done with or without the addition of beads, into floral and geometric motifs.

Huamantla produces carrying bags of various types, belts, tablecloths and rebozos, often of macramé. The city also makes distinctive garments for the image of Our Lady of Charity (Virgen de la Caridad) decorated in an embroidery style called canutillo de oro. These are not for sale but can be seen at the museum dedicated to the image.

San Isidro Buensuceso is noted for embroidery done by sewing machine. Other textile producing communities include San Francisco Tetlanohcan, San Francisco Tepeyanco, Zitlaltepec, Panotla and Yauhquemecan.

== Sawdust carpets ==
Sawdust carpets are arrangements of colored sawdust, flower petals and sometimes other plant matter to create decorative "paintings" over a stretch of road in preparation for a procession. It is an ephemeral craft as it is meant to be destroyed as the procession passes. Its origins are from the pre Hispanic period, and the best-known creation of this craft in the state is in the city of Huamantla, for the feast of the image of Our Lady of Charity (Virgen de la Caridad). However, other towns in Tlaxcala also make them, such as San Vicente Xiloxochitla and San Juan Totolac for Day of the Dead.

== Ceramics ==
Tlaxcala is not one of Mexico major pottery producers, with much made for local consumption, but there is some notable production. One notable feature of much of this production is that it has maintained at least some characteristics from the pre Hispanic period.

San Sebastian Atlapa makes what is known as Ocotlan pottery, as they are mostly sold in this town. It is a simple, red-colored pottery which comes burnished and unburnished to make duck figures, water jugs and containers for other liquids using neither molds or potters' wheels. They come in different shapes including that of animals and usually have striated decoration.

San Salvador Tzompantepec is noted for making comals, cooking pots, including those decorated with incisions in the surface, flowerpots, piñatas and more. This pottery is left in its natural reddish color in two classes, barro rojo and barro bruñido. The later is burnished and principally used for storing liquids. Most of the pieces are made either molds or with the use of a potters' wheel.

In San Damian Texoloc makes pottery heavily influenced by that which was made in the sites of Xochitecatl and Cacaxtla.

Hueyotlipan makes both glazed and unglazed wares, which are usually large pots to cook mole, as well as other cooking vessels and pitchers. Lebrillos also makes glazed wares, for mole and rice.

La Trinidad Tenexyecac is known for its glazed wares, making various types of cooking pots and pitchers, which sizes ranging from miniatures to very large pieces. These pieces are called "barro oxidado" (rusted clay) due to the color of the glaze. They also make clay figures and jewelry pieces.

San Pablo del Monte is known for its Talavera ceramics, making dishes, cups, tiles, large storage vessels called tibors, vases, flowerpots, ashtrays and more. These wares are generally molded and after a coating of the pottery's tradition white background glaze, are painted in various colors, which differs somewhat from the Talavera wares produced in neighboring Puebla.

Other ceramic producing communities include Panotla, Zitlaltepec de Trinidad Santos, Ixtacuixtla de Mariano Matamoros and Tlaxcala.

== Other handcrafts ==
Stone work is done in the San Miguel neighborhood of San Pable del Monte, including working with black marble and onyx to make figures of animals such as bulls, horses, fish birds and more. It is also used to make human figures, bookends, jewelry, chess sets and more. Other communities which do similar work include Santa Cruz Tlaxcala, Tetla, Totolac and San Martin Xaltocan. San Martin Xaltocan specializes in gray, pink and green sandstone to make fountains, columns, table bases, large pots, monuments and more.

Various communities make items from stiff fibers. Two communities noted for their basketry are San Vicente Xiloxochitla and Santa Apolonia Tlacalco. In El Carmen Tequexquitla and San Pablo del Monte they make images from popotillo, along with objects made of palm fronds and chairs with wicker seats. Santa Anita Nopalucan makes petates from palm and ixtle.

In San Juan Ixtenco, they make images by arranging various beans and seeds such as those from corn, lentils, rice and more. Originally done to make religious images to place in the church on certain occasions, the seeds are also used to make secular images such as landscapes and even portraits of famous artists. This work is also done in Zitlaltepc de Trinidad Sanchez Santos.

In the Escuela de Platería (Silver School) in Tlaxco they reproduce colonial era jewelry and other silver items, using the lost wax method. The jewelry can be accented with quartz, amethyst, coral and other semi-precious stones, with motifs such as crosses, birds, keys and fruit. Rosario Ocotoxco in the Yauhquemecan municipality makes bells in bronze and other metals. Tzompantepec makes wrought iron candelabras, figures, frames and more. Paper flowers are made in San Miguel Xochitecatitla for Christmas, and are made in Panotla. Santa Maria Atlihuetzia makes decorative flowers and figurines. Huamantla makes objects with amate paper. San Gabriel Popocatla, Tlatempan and Ixtlacuixtla make cartoneria into alebrijes, piñatas, masks, flowers, religious and secular figures.

San Cosme Xalostoc, Acuamanala, Panotla and San Antonio Cuaxomulco make fireworks.

Españita makes leather goods, especially belts and bags called toros, used in the fermentation of pulque. The community is also known for work with dried corn husks, used to make figures for nativity scenes, dolls, flowers and other figures in Españita.

Terrenate makes candles in the shape of animals, plants and fruits, which are often perfumed.
