= Tzompantepec =

- Municipality
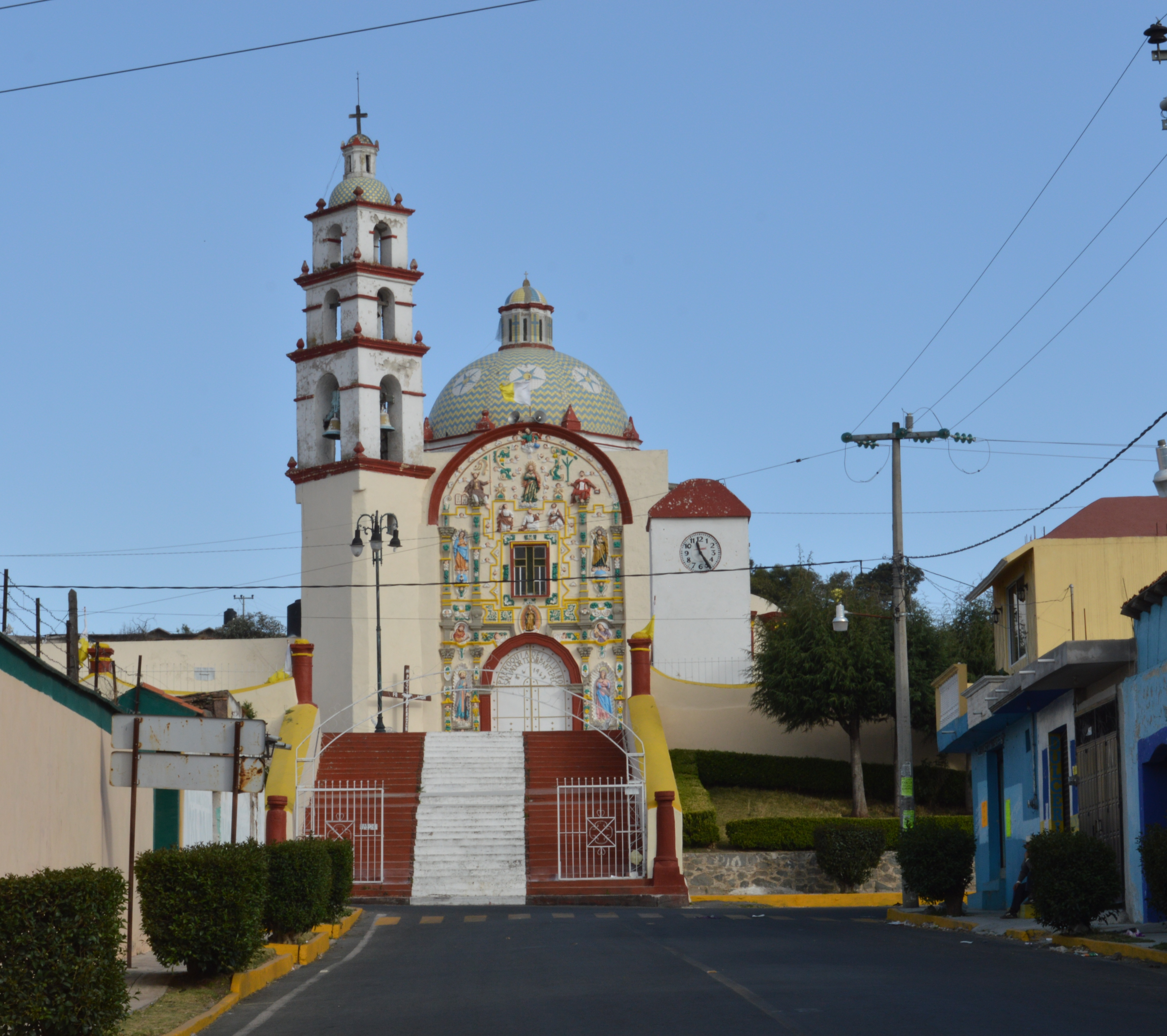
- Divino Salvador Church

- Location within Tlaxcala Location within Mexico
- Coordinates: 19°22′30″N 98°5′26″W
- Country: Mexico
- State: Tlaxcala
- Municipality founded: 1822

Government
  - Municipal president: Lorena Vazquez Zarate

Area
  - Total: 38.357 km^{2} (14.810 sq mi)
- Elevation: 2,460 m (8,070 ft)

Population (2010)
  - Total: 14,611 (municipality) 1,869 (seat)
- Time zone: UTC-6 (Central)
- Postal code: 90490
- Website: Official website

Tzompantepec is a town and its surrounding municipality located in the eastern portion of the Mexican state of Tlaxcala. It is located in the Central Mexican Plateau, almost entirely on the slopes of the La Malinche Volcano. The area was the earliest to be inhabited in Tlaxcala and it was also the site of the defeat of the Tlaxcallans in the early part of the Spanish Conquest. The municipality is mostly farmland but urban sprawl has limited both natural vegetation and wildlife.

== The town ==
The town of Tzompantepec is located in eastern Tlaxcala, 5.5km southwest of Xaloztoc, 9km southeast of Apizaco, and 25km east of the city of Tlaxcala on Highway 119. Although it is the seat of municipality of the same name, it has only about one fifth of the population of the largest community, San Andrés Ahuashuatepec.

The parish church of the town is Divino Salvador (Divine Savior), which was built in the 17th century on a hill overlooking the town. Its facade is heavily decorated with estipite pilasters, gilded images of Saints Anne and Joachim and the Apostles John, Peter and James. The prophets Moses and Elijah appear in the capitals of the columns. The interior was redone in the early 20th century in 19th century style, conserved one painting by Antonio Caro done in 1681 and another by an anonymous painter from the same epoch depicting Jesus as a child accompanied by his parents and grandparents. The atrium in front of the church is still used for burials and is surrounded by a wall with inverted arches, with a clock at the entrance. This church is the focus of the main religious event, the feast of the Divine Savior, celebrated on August 6 and 7th. This event begins at 5 am with the singing of Las Mañanitas accompanied by mariachi, followed by a procession of the image of Jesus. Carnival is also celebrated here, with traditional dance such as the Huehues, danced to various types of music, including current pop songs. These dancers generally wear colorful costumes with religious symbolism as well as wooden masks.

The San Andrés Church is on the main square of the town. Its facade is a mix of brick and glazed tile, a style called Palafox. Its walls are about a meter thick with stone, with the same material used to create the vault that covers the structure. The left side tower has two levels, arches, merlons and a small cupola. The right side tower has one level with arches. The atrium serves as a cemetery. Inside the baptistery is noted for its polychromatic stucco work.

The San Juan Temple dates to the 18th century. It has a simple facade and stone walls up to nearly a meter thick. It is also covered by a vault. The main entrance has an arch and choir window. Above this is a niche with an image of John the Baptist and a cross made of stucco. It has only one tower, with three levels which has arches and merlons.

== The municipality ==
As seat, the town of Tzompantepec serves as the local government for seventeen locations, thirteen of which are populated communities. The largest of these are San Andrés Ahuashuatepec (pop. 10,114), San Juan Quetzalcoapan (pop. 1,262) and Xaltianquisco (pop. 884). The other locations are San Mateo Inophil (pop. 256), Rancho Buena Vista, Rancho Amoltepec, Otongatepec, La Providencia las Huertas, Rancho Cruztitla, El Llano, Mazapa, Fernando Armenta Ramos, Cuayecatl, Lucas Flores, Fraccionamiento del Divino Salvador, San José el Potrero, Imelda Flores Sanchez.

Together, these communities comprise a territory of 38.357km2 and borders the municipalities of Apizaco, Xaloztoc, Cuaxomulco, San José Teacalco, Tocatlán, Huamantla and Santa Cruz Tlaxcala.

The municipal government consists of a municipal president, a syndic and seven representatives called regidors.

== Socioeconomics ==
In the municipality, 57.3% live in poverty, with 8.6% in extreme poverty. Ten percent live in substandard housing and 25% suffer food shortages. However, overall socioeconomic marginalization is considered low because of the availability of social services such as medical attention and schools.

The main economic activities of the municipality are agriculture, livestock and manufacturing. The main handcraft of the municipality is ceramics, especially burnished and red clay pottery. One noted piece is the comal, used for the making of tortillas. The municipality is part of the “Textiles and Center” tourist route, which also promotes the Tzompantzingo Mountain, site of a major confrontation between Tlaxcallan and Spanish forces early in the Conquest.

The average schooling of residents is 9.3 years, above the state average of 8.8. The municipality provides 16 preschools, 11 primary schools, eight middle schools and four high schools.

Traditional dishes are based on local agricultural production and include those made with maguey larvae along with soups made with mushrooms, tortillas, corn, squash flowers, peas, cactus and fava beans, quesadillas with squash flowers and huitlacoche, barbacoa and mixote.

== History ==
The name is derived from Nahuatl and means "hill where the skulls of the sacrifice are stored".

Tzompantepec is the site of the earliest human settlements in Tlaxcala. The area was first inhabited about 12,000 years ago with agriculture appearing about 8,300 years ago, leading to settlements. Around 1700 or 1600 BCE, various villages in this area into Puebla called the Tzompantepec culture, named after the site in the municipality, which contains the most typical and most complete remains of this culture. In the late phase of this culture, terrace farming appeared as well as houses on raised foundations and irrigation. The ceramics of this culture indicate influence the Tehuacan Valley in Puebla and from the Gulf Coast.

The area remained occupied but not organized into a dominion until the 12th century, when consolidation of the three cultural groups of the state began. This area was part of the Teo Chichimecas, whose influence extended to Lake Texcoco by the 14th century. Another important group for this area are the Otomis, who migrated into Tlaxcala during these centuries. The 14th and 15th centuries were prosperous for the area and the population grew with contacts as far as the Yucatán Peninsula and Central America, mostly through trade.

In the latter 15th century, the Aztec Empire threatened that of Tlaxcala. It could not conquer the area but blockaded it from its commercial ties, causing hardship. Tzompantepec and the rest of the dominion suffered shortages of goods as well as losses of men to Aztec flower wars, aimed to capture sacrifices for the gods. At the time of the Spanish arrival, the town was an important one in the Tlaxcallan dominion.

In 1519, Hernán Cortés and the Spanish arrived with Totonac allies. In Tzompantepec on September 2 of that year, there was a major battle with the Tlaxcallans. The superior arms of the Spanish gave them victory against the Tlaxcallan force headed by Xicohtencatl. The battle made the Tlaxcallans allies with the Spanish against the Aztecs.

Shortly after the Conquest, Cortés established a battalion here and the Divino Salvador Church was founded by the Franciscans. By the mid 16th century, this church became subordinate to Huamantla and the San Andrés Church was founded.

During the colonial period, the town of Tzompantepec governed an area that included what are now Cuaxomulco, San Francisco Tetlanohcan, San José Teacalco and Huamantla, but by the 19th century, it had become part of the Huamantla district.

In the late Mexican War of Independence, insurgents under Nicolás Bravo were in the area, and the municipality was established in 1822. During the Reform War, Tzompantepec was allied with the Liberals.

The railroad connecting Mexico City with Veracruz reached the municipality in 1873. A station was built in Tzompantepec, which allowed the area to export its grain production to both Mexico City and the Gulf coast. This mostly benefitted large haciendas such as Xaltelulco and Jonecuila. This put pressure on lands still in indigenous hands and for this reason many in the municipality supported the Mexican Revolution. However, only small, guerrilla-style clashes occurred here during the conflict.

== Geography ==
The municipality is located in the Central Mexican Plateau with an average altitude of 2,460 meters above sea level. Almost all of the territory is on the slopes of the La Malinche volcano. About twenty percent of the territory is rugged mountain, mostly in the south and west. Seventy percent is semi flat, mostly in the center and ten percent is flat, concentrated in the northwest. Most of the territory has been modified by humans. 4,812 hectares is dedicated to agricultural production, 85% of which is dedicated to crops and the rest to pasture.

=== Hydrography ===
The Apizaco River runs through a small portion for about four km. The smaller Amomolc extends through 4.5 meters, along with a number of seasonal streams. Other water sources include wells.

=== Climate ===
The climate is temperate and semi moist. Average annual rainfall is 817.6mm, with most rain falling between April and September. The warmest months are April and May. Prevailing winds are from the northeast and average annual temperatures vary from a low of 4.7C to a high of 22.6C.

=== Flora and fauna ===
At the higher elevations there are various types of oak (Quercus laeta, Q. obtusata, Q. crassipes) as well as pines (Pinus leiophylla and Pino pseudostrobus). In the area of the Apizaco River there are trees such as Alnus acuminate, Taxodium mucrunatum, Salix bonplandiana and Fraxinus uhdei. The rest of the territory is farmland or urban areas with secondary vegetation.

Because of urban sprawl, wildlife is limited to smaller species such as rabbits, hares, moles, opossums, reptiles and birds.

Reforestation efforts have includes the planting of over 4,000 trees mostly by school and ecological organizations.
