= Municipalities of Tlaxcala =

List of municipalities of Mexican state

Map of Mexico with Tlaxcala highlighted

Tlaxcala is a state in central Mexico that is divided into 60 municipalities. According to the 2020 INEGI census, it is the fifth least populated state with 1,342,977 inhabitants and the second smallest by land area spanning 3,996.6 square kilometres (1,543.1 sq mi).

Municipalities in Tlaxcala are administratively autonomous of the state according to the 115th article of the 1917 Constitution of Mexico. Every three years, citizens elect a municipal president (Spanish: presidente municipal) by a plurality voting system who heads a concurrently elected municipal council (ayuntamiento) responsible for providing public services for their constituents. The municipal council consists of a variable number of trustees and councillors (regidores y síndicos). Municipalities are responsible for public services (such as water and sewerage), street lighting, public safety, traffic, and the maintenance of public parks, gardens, and cemeteries. They may also assist the state and federal governments in education, emergency fire and medical services, environmental protection, and maintenance of monuments and historical landmarks. Since 1984, they have had the power to collect property taxes and user fees, although more funds are obtained from the state and federal governments than from their own income.

The largest municipality by population is Tlaxcala, with 99,896 residents (7.43% of the state total), while the smallest is San Lucas Tecopilco with 3,077 residents. The largest municipality by land area is Tlaxco which spans 574.70 km^{2} (221.89 sq mi), and the smallest is San Lorenzo Axocomanitla with 4.50 km^{2} (1.74 sq mi). In 1995, 16 municipalities were created, the most recent being Benito Juárez, which was established on October 9, 1995.

== Municipalities ==
Largest municipalities in Tlaxcala by population

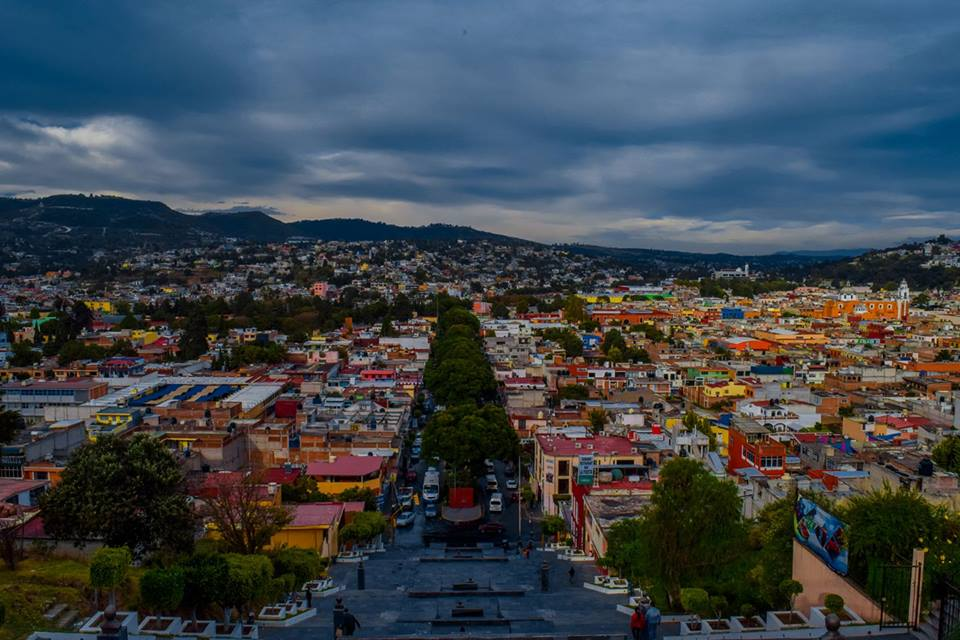
Tlaxcala, capital and largest municipality by population in Tlaxcala

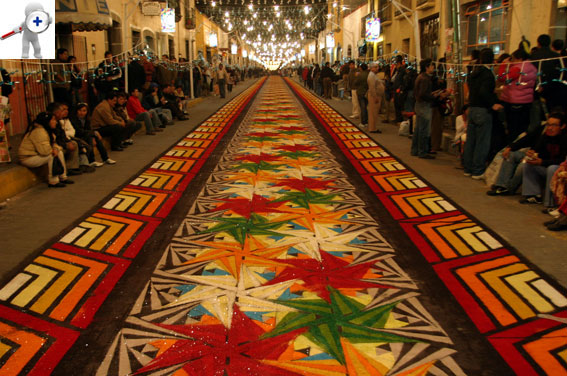
Huamantla is the second most populous municipality.

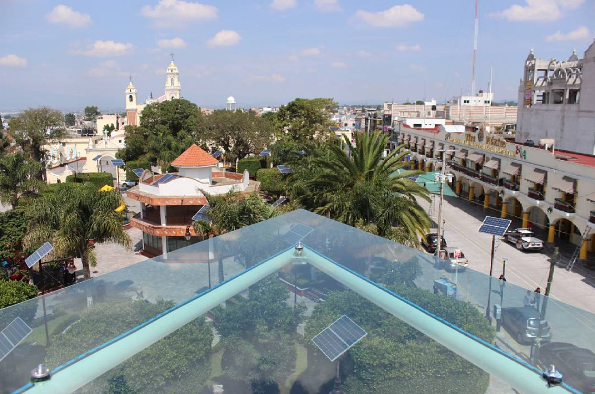
San Pablo del Monte, third largest municipality by population

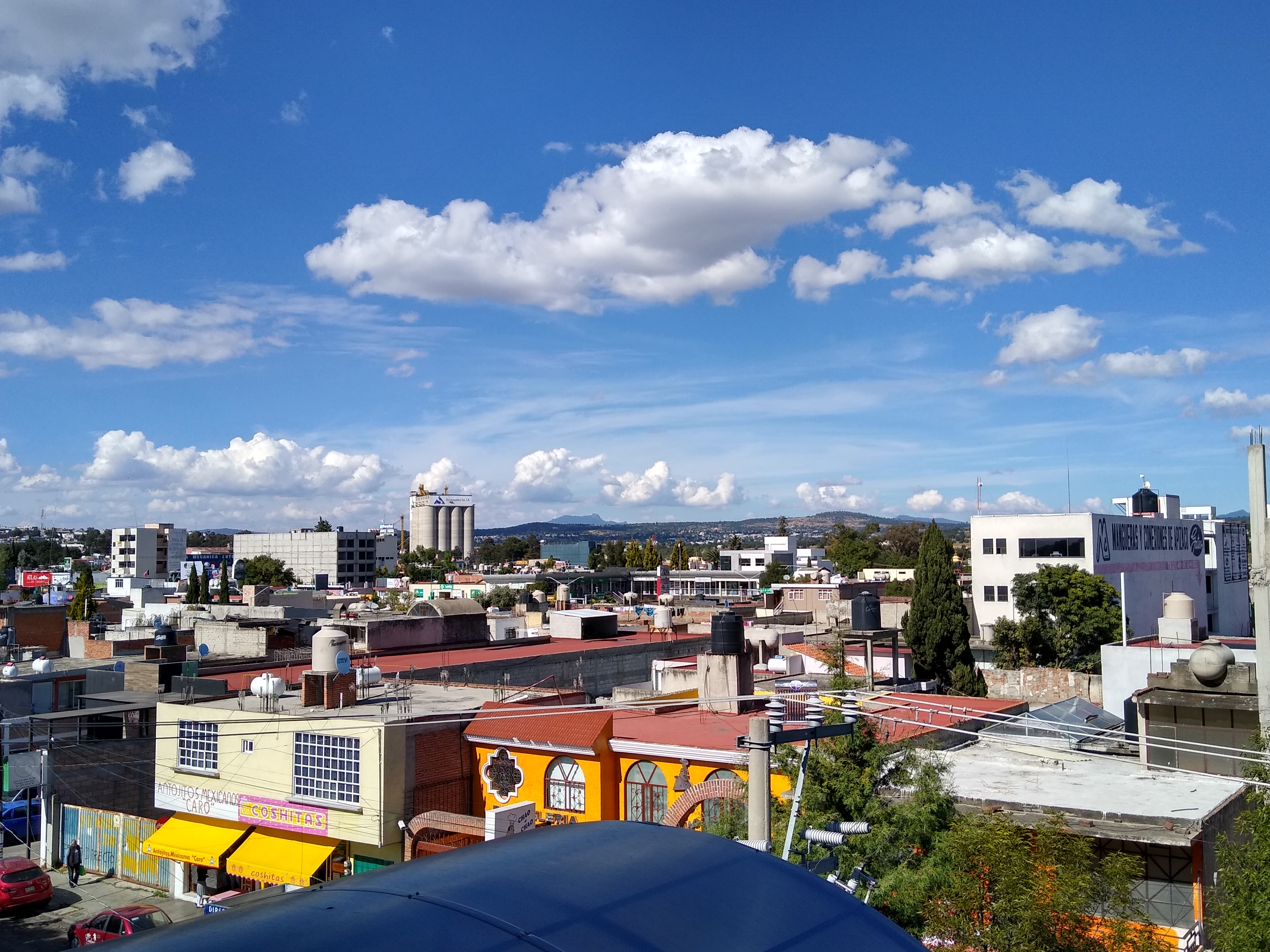
Apizaco is the fourth most populous municipality.

† State capital

Municipalities of Tlaxcala
Name	Municipal seat	Population (2020)	Population (2010)	Change	Land area		Population density (2020)	Incorporation date (Note: If there is no primary source for the incorporation date, the oldest date in which the municipality is referred to is used.)
Name	Municipal seat	Population (2020)	Population (2010)	Change	km^{2}	sq mi	Population density (2020)	Incorporation date
Acuamanala (Note: Acuamanala was originally incorporated as Miguel Hidalgo, changing its name on April 1, 1994.)	Acuamanala	6,432	5,711	+12.6%	15.0	5.8	428.8/km^{2} (1,110.6/sq mi)	September 9, 1934
Amaxac (Note: Amaxac was originally incorporated as Guerrero, changing its name on September 9, 1942.)	Amaxac de Guerrero	11,403	9,875	+15.5%	11.2	4.3	1,018.1/km^{2} (2,636.9/sq mi)	May 31, 1902
Apetatitlán	Apetatitlán	16,003	13,361	+19.8%	11.6	4.5	1,379.6/km^{2} (3,573.1/sq mi)	February 14, 1832
Apizaco (Note: Apizaco was originally incorporated as Barrón-Escandón, changing its name on March 3, 1971.)	Apizaco	80,725	76,492	+5.5%	43.6	16.8	1,851.5/km^{2} (4,795.3/sq mi)	May 9, 1873
Atlangatepec	Atlangatepec	7,087	6,018	+17.8%	108.2	41.8	65.5/km^{2} (169.6/sq mi)	June 26, 1871
Atltzayanca	Atltzayanca	18,111	15,935	+13.7%	189.8	73.3	95.4/km^{2} (247.1/sq mi)	June 26, 1871
Benito Juárez	Benito Juárez	6,211	5,687	+9.2%	25.6	9.9	242.6/km^{2} (628.4/sq mi)	October 9, 1995
Calpulalpan	Calpulalpan	51,172	44,807	+14.2%	253.9	98.0	201.5/km^{2} (522.0/sq mi)	1826
Chiautempan	Santa Ana Chiautempan	73,215	66,149	+10.7%	77.2	29.8	948.4/km^{2} (2,456.3/sq mi)	February 14, 1832
Contla	Contla	38,579	35,084	+10.0%	26.1	10.1	1,478.1/km^{2} (3,828.3/sq mi)	February 14, 1832
Cuapiaxtla	Cuapiaxtla	16,222	13,671	+18.7%	82.6	31.9	196.4/km^{2} (508.7/sq mi)	February 14, 1832
Cuaxomulco	Cuaxomulco	5,928	5,066	+17.0%	16.7	6.4	355.0/km^{2} (919.4/sq mi)	January 1, 1936
El Carmen Tequexquitla	Villa de El Carmen Tequexquitla	17,332	15,368	+12.8%	58.4	22.5	296.8/km^{2} (768.7/sq mi)	August 11, 1857
Emiliano Zapata	Emiliano Zapata	4,951	4,146	+19.4%	50.1	19.3	98.8/km^{2} (255.9/sq mi)	September 27, 1995
Españita (Note: Españita was merged with Lázaro Cárdenas (present day Sanctórum) for three months in 1931.)	Españita	9,416	8,399	+12.1%	139.7	53.9	67.4/km^{2} (174.6/sq mi)	June 4, 1867
Huamantla	Huamantla	98,764	84,979	+16.2%	348.8	134.7	283.2/km^{2} (733.4/sq mi)	February 14, 1832
Hueyotlipan	Hueyotlipan	15,190	13,879	+9.4%	176.0	68.0	86.3/km^{2} (223.5/sq mi)	February 14, 1832
Ixtacuixtla (Note: Ixtacuixtla was originally incorporated as San Felipe Yxtacuixtla, changing its name on June 4, 1867.)	Villa Mariano Matamoros	38,970	35,162	+10.8%	161.5	62.4	241.3/km^{2} (625.0/sq mi)	February 14, 1832
Ixtenco (Note: Ixtenco was originally incorporated as San Juan Yxtenco, changing its name on June 4, 1867.)	Ixtenco	7,504	6,791	+10.5%	44.4	17.1	169.0/km^{2} (437.7/sq mi)	February 14, 1832
La Magdalena Tlaltelulco	La Magdalena Tlaltelulco	19,036	16,834	+13.1%	11.8	4.6	1,613.2/km^{2} (4,178.2/sq mi)	August 18, 1995
Lázaro Cárdenas	Lázaro Cárdenas	3,534	2,769	+27.6%	25.4	9.8	139.1/km^{2} (360.4/sq mi)	September 27, 1995
Mazatecochco (Note: Mazatecochco was originally incorporated as José María Morelos, changing its name on February 1, 1984.)	Mazatecochco	11,592	9,740	+19.0%	14.6	5.6	794.0/km^{2} (2,056.4/sq mi)	January 14, 1943
Muñoz (Note: Muñoz was originally incorporated as Domingo Arenas, changing its name on February 1, 1984.)	Muñoz	4,755	4,285	+11.0%	36.4	14.1	130.6/km^{2} (338.3/sq mi)	October 21, 1953
Nanacamilpa (Note: Nanacamilpa was originally incorporated as Ing. Manuel Santillán, changing its name to Mariano Arista in 1944 and to its current name on February 1, 1984.)	Nanacamilpa	18,686	16,640	+12.3%	108.2	41.8	172.7/km^{2} (447.3/sq mi)	December 9, 1942
Natívitas	Natívitas	26,309	23,621	+11.4%	52.5	20.3	501.1/km^{2} (1,297.9/sq mi)	February 14, 1832
Panotla (Note: Panotla was not incorporated as a municipality between 1867 and 1882.)	Panotla	28,357	25,128	+12.9%	61.0	23.6	464.9/km^{2} (1,204.0/sq mi)	February 14, 1832
Papalotla	Papalotla	33,499	26,997	+24.1%	23.2	9.0	1,443.9/km^{2} (3,739.7/sq mi)	January 1, 1880
San Damián Texóloc	San Damián Texóloc	5,884	5,064	+16.2%	10.2	3.9	576.9/km^{2} (1,494.1/sq mi)	September 27, 1995
San Francisco Tetlanohcan	San Francisco Tetlanohcan	11,761	9,880	+19.0%	39.5	15.3	297.7/km^{2} (771.2/sq mi)	August 18, 1995
San Jerónimo Zacualpan	San Jerónimo Zacualpan	4,092	3,581	+14.3%	7.8	3.0	524.6/km^{2} (1,358.7/sq mi)	September 27, 1995
San José Teacalco	San José Teacalco	6,436	5,660	+13.7%	36.0	13.9	178.8/km^{2} (463.0/sq mi)	August 18, 1995
San Juan Huactzinco	San Juan Huactzinco	7,688	6,821	+12.7%	4.6	1.8	1,671.3/km^{2} (4,328.7/sq mi)	August 11, 1995
San Lorenzo Axocomanitla	San Lorenzo Axocomanitla	5,689	5,045	+12.8%	4.5	1.7	1,264.2/km^{2} (3,274.3/sq mi)	October 2, 1995
San Lucas Tecopilco	San Lucas Tecopilco	3,077	2,833	+8.6%	28.8	11.1	106.8/km^{2} (276.7/sq mi)	October 2, 1995
San Pablo del Monte	San Pablo del Monte	82,688	69,615	+18.8%	59.7	23.1	1,385.1/km^{2} (3,587.3/sq mi)	February 14, 1832
Sanctórum (Note: Sanctórum was originally incorporated as Lázaro Cárdenas, changing its name on February 1, 1984.)	Sanctórum	9,432	8,474	+11.3%	99.2	38.3	95.1/km^{2} (246.3/sq mi)	March 28, 1935
Santa Ana Nopalucan	Santa Ana Nopalucan	7,952	6,857	+16.0%	9.2	3.6	864.3/km^{2} (2,238.7/sq mi)	October 2, 1995
Santa Apolonia Teacalco	Santa Apolonia Teacalco	4,636	4,349	+6.6%	8.0	3.1	579.5/km^{2} (1,500.9/sq mi)	August 9, 1995
Santa Catarina Ayometla	Santa Catarina Ayometla	9,463	7,992	+18.4%	10.1	3.9	936.9/km^{2} (2,426.6/sq mi)	August 15, 1995
Santa Cruz Quilehtla	Santa Cruz Quilehtla	7,750	6,296	+23.1%	5.4	2.1	1,435.2/km^{2} (3,717.1/sq mi)	August 11, 1995
Santa Cruz Tlaxcala	Santa Cruz Tlaxcala	24,116	17,968	+34.2%	25.9	10.0	931.1/km^{2} (2,411.6/sq mi)	February 14, 1832
Santa Isabel Xiloxoxtla	Santa Isabel Xiloxoxtla	5,443	4,436	+22.7%	6.0	2.3	907.2/km^{2} (2,349.6/sq mi)	August 15, 1995
Tenancingo	Tenancingo	12,974	11,763	+10.3%	12.5	4.8	1,037.9/km^{2} (2,688.2/sq mi)	July 10, 1897
Teolocholco	Teolocholco	25,257	21,671	+16.5%	76.6	29.6	329.7/km^{2} (854.0/sq mi)	February 14, 1832
Tepetitla	Tepetitla	22,274	18,725	+19.0%	23.1	8.9	964.2/km^{2} (2,497.4/sq mi)	May 1, 1880
Tepeyanco	Tepeyanco	13,328	11,048	+20.6%	16.4	6.3	812.7/km^{2} (2,104.8/sq mi)	February 14, 1832
Terrenate	Terrenate	15,475	13,775	+12.3%	154.7	59.7	100.0/km^{2} (259.1/sq mi)	August 11, 1857
Tetla	Tetla	35,284	28,760	+22.7%	169.8	65.6	207.8/km^{2} (538.2/sq mi)	February 14, 1832
Tetlatlahuca	Tetlatlahuca	13,561	12,410	+9.3%	26.1	10.1	519.6/km^{2} (1,345.7/sq mi)	February 14, 1832
Tlaxcala	Tlaxcala de Xicohténcatl	99,896	89,795	+11.2%	52.0	20.1	1,921.1/km^{2} (4,975.6/sq mi)	February 14, 1832
Tlaxco	Tlaxco	45,438	39,939	+13.8%	574.7	221.9	79.1/km^{2} (204.8/sq mi)	February 14, 1832
Tocatlán	Tocatlán	6,294	5,589	+12.6%	14.3	5.5	440.1/km^{2} (1,140.0/sq mi)	September 24, 1952
Totolac	San Juan Totolac	22,529	20,625	+9.2%	13.8	5.3	1,632.5/km^{2} (4,228.2/sq mi)	November 3, 1906
Tzompantepec (Note: Tzompantepec was originally incorporated as San Salvador Zumpantepec, changing its name on June 4, 1867.)	Tzompantepec	18,006	14,611	+23.2%	38.4	14.8	468.9/km^{2} (1,214.5/sq mi)	February 14, 1832
Xaloztoc	Xaloztoc	25,607	21,769	+17.6%	41.5	16.0	617.0/km^{2} (1,598.1/sq mi)	November 25, 1873
Xaltocan	Xaltocan	10,601	9,777	+8.4%	102.8	39.7	103.1/km^{2} (267.1/sq mi)	February 14, 1832
Xicohtzinco	Xicohtzinco	14,197	12,255	+15.8%	7.3	2.8	1,944.8/km^{2} (5,037.0/sq mi)	January 15, 1942
Yauhquemehcan (Note: Yauhquemehcan was originally incorporated as San Dionisio Yeuquemecan, changing its name on June 4, 1867.)	Yauhquemehcan	42,242	33,081	+27.7%	37.4	14.4	1,129.5/km^{2} (2,925.3/sq mi)	February 14, 1832
Zacatelco	Zacatelco	45,717	38,654	+18.3%	29.5	11.4	1,549.7/km^{2} (4,013.8/sq mi)	February 14, 1832
Zitlaltépec (Note: Zitlaltépec was renamed Trinidad Sánchez Santos from 1959 to 1984.)	Zitlaltépec	9,207	8,224	+12.0%	77.1	29.8	119.4/km^{2} (309.3/sq mi)	February 14, 1832
Tlaxcala	—	1,342,977	1,169,936	+14.8%	3,996.6	1,543.1	336.0/km^{2} (870.3/sq mi)	—
Mexico	—	126,014,024	112,336,538	+12.2%	1,960,646.7	757,010	64.3/km^{2} (166.5/sq mi)	—
