= Teacalco =

Teacalco may refer to one of two places in the Mexican state of Tlaxcala:

- San José Teacalco
- Santa Apolonia Teacalco
