= Benito Juárez Municipality =

Benito Juárez Municipality may refer to one of several Mexican municipalities:

- Benito Juárez Municipality, Guerrero
- Benito Juárez Municipality, Quintana Roo
- Benito Juárez Municipality, Sonora
- Benito Juárez Municipality, Tlaxcala
- Benito Juárez Municipality, Veracruz
- Benito Juárez Municipality, Zacatecas

== See also ==
- Juárez Municipality (disambiguation)
