= San Miguel del Milagro =

Coordinates: 19°14′N 98°20′W

San Miguel del Milagro is a town in the municipality of Nativitas in the state of Tlaxcala in Mexico. It was the site of a 1631 apparition of St. Michael the Archangel to Diego Lázaro.
