= Zitlaltepec =

Zitlaltepec may refer to either of two locations in Mexico:

- Zitlaltepec de Trinidad Sánchez Santos, in the state of Tlaxcala
- San Juan Zitlaltepec, in the state of Mexico
