= Santa Ana Nopalucan =

Santa Ana Nopalucan Land of the Prickly Pear Cactus and Reed Bed Mats Santa Ana Nopalucan
- Municipality
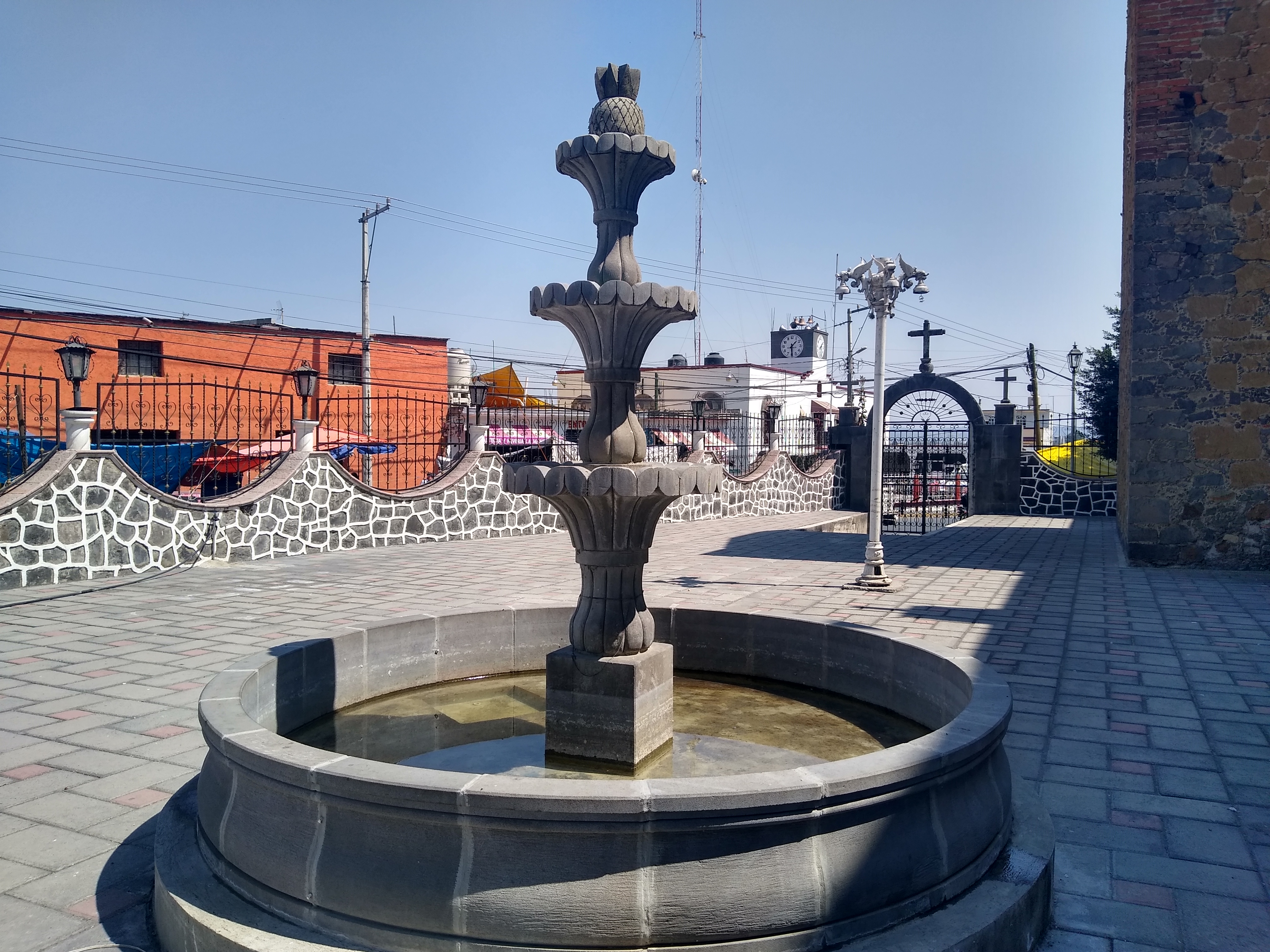

- Flag

- Location within Tlaxcala Location within Mexico
- Coordinates: 19.3°N 98.3333°W
- Country: Mexico
- State: Tlaxcala
- Time zone: UTC-6 (Central)

Santa Ana Nopalucan is a town and its surrounding municipality in the Mexican state of Tlaxcala.

== Other native names for Nopalucan ==
- Nopalucan - from the náhuatl “Nopalli“ (prickly pear) and the location (place),
- Land or region of prickly pears,
- Nopalucan - ground of the prickly pear and the Tequezquite - ground of the mat and the corn,
- Land of the tent of the crayfish people,
- The place where women play an important role in the economic life of this community.

== History ==
=== Pre-Hispanic ===
The history of the first settlers of what today is the municipality of Santa Ana Nopalucan goes back to the Olmeca-Xicallanca culture, the region of Nopalucan was step by step forced towards the territory of Cacaxtla and Xochitécatl. In its region there was cultivated the cacaxtli, a plant that gave birth to the name of the ceremonial center that was built there.

This valley was of great importance when the old Tlaxcaltecas were besieged by the Aztecs and were forced to dispense with the use of salt on their food, which at that time was a marine condiment. It was replaced by "Tequezquite", which was a mineral salt that was collected in Nopalucan and El Carmen Tequexquitla. In these same locations were the main suppliers of the tule or reed mats that were used by the inhabitants to sleep. Similarly, the inhabitants of Nopalucan along with those of Saint Vincent Xiloxochitla, were the main suppliers and transporters of the materials, which were also used for sleep. The tule or junco or reed was extracted from the trenches or canals built to separate the waters of the "Lagunillas" (marshes) and was an important source of trade in the pre-Cortesian artisan markets of the time. It brought great benefits for the inhabitants of Nopalucan.

=== The colony ===
Santa Ana Nopalucan or Santa Anita, was previously what they used to call it, due to the fact that it possessed few inhabitants. There were clay regions which had formed vast areas of 'Lagunillas', which were used during the colonial period for the grazing of livestock, and also where salt was obtained in the gaps.

The process of secularization began in Tlaxcala in December 1640, when the then Bishop of Puebla, Juan de Palofox y Mendoza, came in person to this part of his diocese to implement the provisions of the Catholic hierarchy. With this measure, was annulled the concession that the Franciscans shall not allow the presence of other churches within the province of Tlaxcala. The Church of Nopalucan was secularised in 1640; however, it was not their convent until May 29 of 1770.

In the year 1623, there was a registration of the doctrines of the province of Tlaxcala. It was friar Blas de Escobar, guardian of the Convent of San Felipe, who carried out this register in which was reported that during the visit to Santa Ana Nopalucan, he met with 107 people and the place was about one league from the head of the doctrine. By 1779, the parish of San Felipe Ixtacuixtla was composed of peoples of La Santísima Trinidad (the Holy Trinity of) Tenanyecac, Santa Ana Nopalucan, Santa Inés Tecuezcoma, Santa Justina, who did not have communal lands.

=== Nineteenth Century ===
The reform.- The state of Puebla on its part requested the Congress to grant the annexation of Tlaxcala, because it did not have a sufficient elements to be considered as a sovereign state. Faced with this situation the Tlaxcaltecas protested and they arrested the annexationist desires of Puebla. Only to Tlaxcala did the Congress give the category of a sovereign state, but the territory, was subject to the federal powers and was governed by a political leader who was appointed by the President of the Republic. For this reason, Tlaxcala was divided into seven parties: Tlaxcala, Ixtacuixtla, Huamantla, Nativitas, Chiautempan, Tlaxco and Apizaco. Santa Ana Nopalucan was integrated into the party of Ixtacuixtla.
