= Españita =

- Municipality
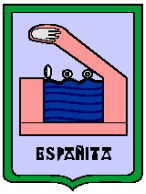
- Coat of arms

- Location within Tlaxcala Location within Mexico
- Coordinates: 19.4392°N 98.4367°W
- Country: Mexico
- State: Tlaxcala
- Time zone: UTC-6 (Central)

Españita is a town and its surrounding municipality in the Mexican state of Tlaxcala.
