= Tepetitla de Lardizábal =

- Municipality
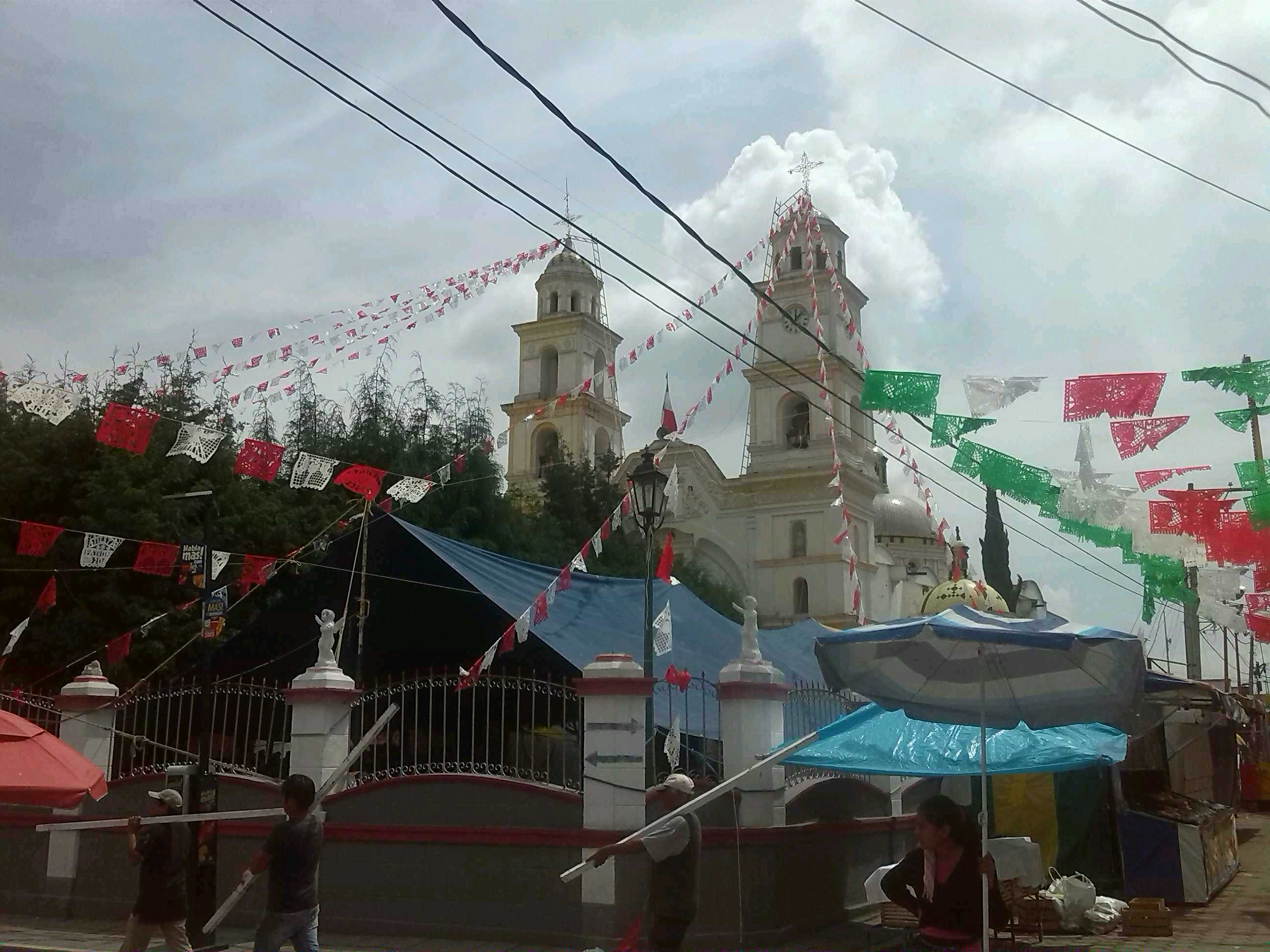
- Church of San Mateo in Tepetitla, Tlaxcala

- Location within Tlaxcala Location within Mexico
- Coordinates: 19.0000°N 98.0000°W
- Country: Mexico
- State: Tlaxcala
- Time zone: UTC-6 (Central)

Tepetitla de Lardizábal is a town and its surrounding municipality in the Mexican state of Tlaxcala.
