= Amaxac de Guerrero =

- Municipality
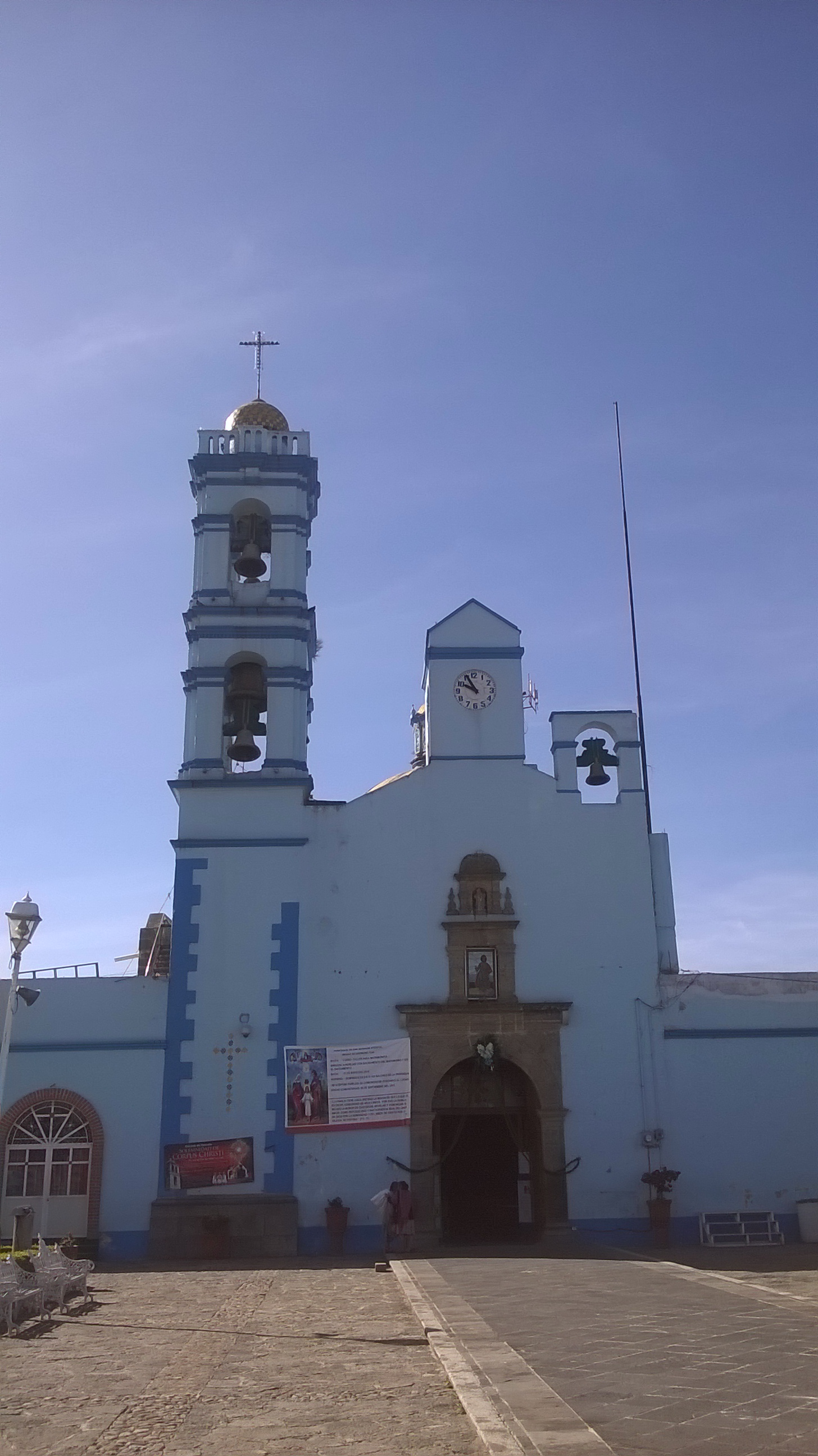
- Church of San Bernabé

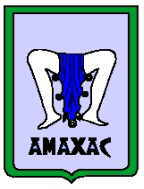
- Coat of arms

- Location within Tlaxcala Location within Mexico
- Coordinates: 19°22′N 98°11′W
- Country: Mexico
- State: Tlaxcala

Government
  - Presidente municipal: Reyes Vázquez Hernández
- Time zone: UTC-6 (Central)

Amaxac de Guerrero is a municipality in the Mexican state of Tlaxcala.

== Geography ==
=== Climate ===
Climate data for Amaxac de Guerrero (1951–2010)
Month	Jan	Feb	Mar	Apr	May	Jun	Jul	Aug	Sep	Oct	Nov	Dec	Year
Record high °C (°F)	29.5 (85.1)	31.0 (87.8)	35.0 (95.0)	37.0 (98.6)	39.5 (103.1)	40.5 (104.9)	31.5 (88.7)	31.0 (87.8)	31.0 (87.8)	31.0 (87.8)	32.0 (89.6)	29.0 (84.2)	40.5 (104.9)
Mean daily maximum °C (°F)	23.6 (74.5)	25.3 (77.5)	26.7 (80.1)	27.4 (81.3)	27.7 (81.9)	26.0 (78.8)	24.7 (76.5)	24.6 (76.3)	24.2 (75.6)	24.1 (75.4)	24.2 (75.6)	23.4 (74.1)	25.2 (77.4)
Daily mean °C (°F)	12.4 (54.3)	14.0 (57.2)	15.7 (60.3)	16.8 (62.2)	17.4 (63.3)	17.3 (63.1)	16.1 (61.0)	15.9 (60.6)	15.7 (60.3)	14.9 (58.8)	13.9 (57.0)	12.6 (54.7)	15.2 (59.4)
Mean daily minimum °C (°F)	1.3 (34.3)	2.8 (37.0)	4.7 (40.5)	6.2 (43.2)	7.2 (45.0)	8.7 (47.7)	7.6 (45.7)	7.3 (45.1)	7.3 (45.1)	5.7 (42.3)	3.6 (38.5)	1.7 (35.1)	5.3 (41.5)
Record low °C (°F)	−6.0 (21.2)	−4.0 (24.8)	−3.5 (25.7)	1.0 (33.8)	0.0 (32.0)	1.0 (33.8)	1.0 (33.8)	2.0 (35.6)	0.0 (32.0)	−2.5 (27.5)	−6.0 (21.2)	−7.0 (19.4)	−7.0 (19.4)
Average precipitation mm (inches)	10.3 (0.41)	6.1 (0.24)	11.5 (0.45)	33.5 (1.32)	68.9 (2.71)	143.1 (5.63)	134.6 (5.30)	131.1 (5.16)	131.9 (5.19)	61.9 (2.44)	12.7 (0.50)	6.6 (0.26)	752.2 (29.61)
Average precipitation days (≥ 0.1 mm)	1.3	1.1	2.0	4.8	9.3	13.4	14.7	14.7	13.3	6.8	1.8	0.7	83.9
Source: Servicio Meteorologico Nacional

== City Hall ==
Amaxac de Guerrero's City Hall was built around 60 years ago. Initially, there was only one floor, but with time and population growth, a second floor was added that houses the administrative offices. The flooring of the second story is of tongue and groove planking. There is a photo gallery of former mayors. Upon entering the building, the municipal library is to the left. It has more than five thousand books covering a wide variety of subjects. It also has internet access. The city's logo is located on the front of the building just above and to the right of the main entrance at the second floor level.

== Localities ==
- Amaxac
- San Damián Tlacocalpan
