= Panotla =

- Municipality
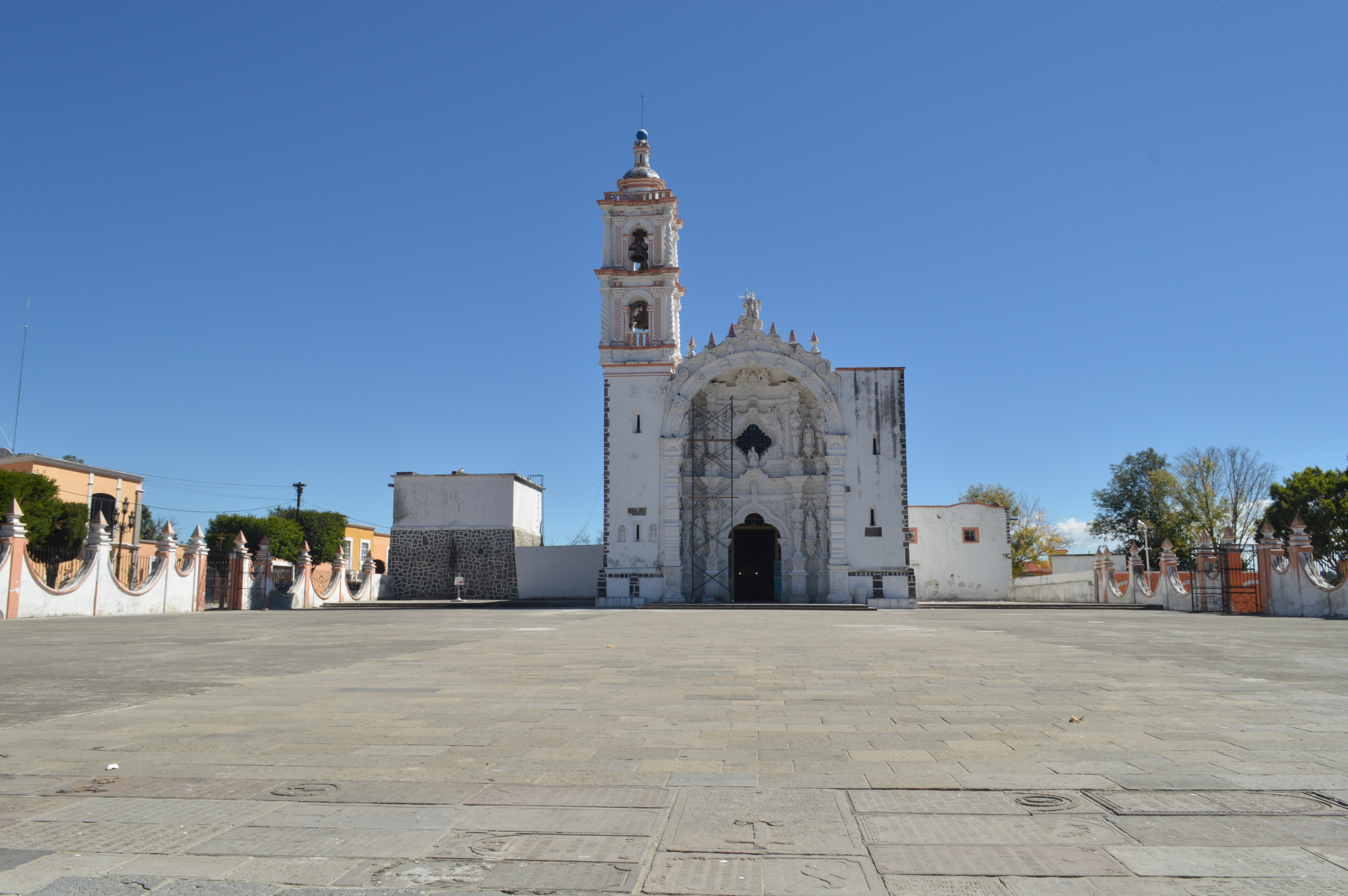
- View of the San Nicolás de Bari church in the center of town

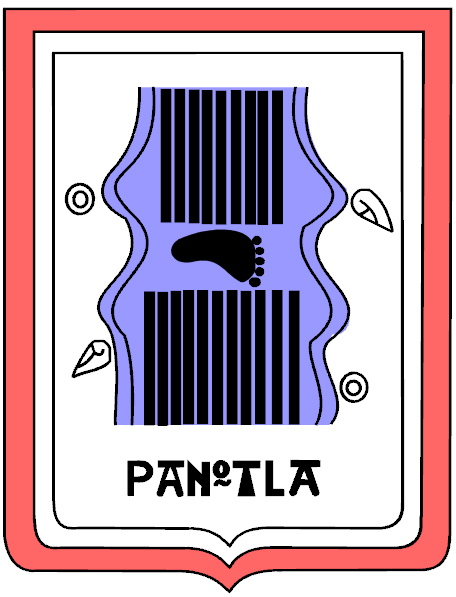
- Coat of arms

- Location within Tlaxcala Location within Mexico
- Coordinates: 19°19′N 98°16′W
- Country: Mexico
- State: Tlaxcala

Government
  - Presidente municipal: Eymard Grande Rodríguez
- Time zone: UTC-6 (Central)

Panotla is a town and its surrounding municipality in the Mexican state of Tlaxcala. It is located about four km to the west of the city of Tlaxcala.

Panotla contains a number of notable churches from different eras of its history. The San Nicolás de Bari church was dedicated in 1796. It has an ornate baroque facade framed by an arch and a two level bell tower. The baroque elements of both are made with mortar and include estipite columns as well as floral, animal and human motifs. These face onto a large atrium which is bordered by a wall. The interior of the church consists of a single nave with Neoclassical altarpieces and an organ from the 17th century. The Nuestra Señora de la Defensa Sanctuary is located in the community of San Ambrosio Texantla was constructed between the 17th and 18th centuries. The exterior has an octagon dome and a tower with merlons on its corners. The facade is tiled. The interior contains an image of the Virgin Mary called Our Lady of the Defense brought by Juan Bautista de Jesús which can be seen on the main altar. The San Ambrosio Texantla Church was built between the 19th and 20th centuries, whose atrium contains a number of graves. The San Francisco de Asis Church located in the community of San Francisco Temetzontla is in the north of the municipality and built in the 18th century. The facades has two levels the top of the portal is framed by a shell form. The bell tower has three levels and contains a clock.
