= Cuapiaxtla =

- Municipality
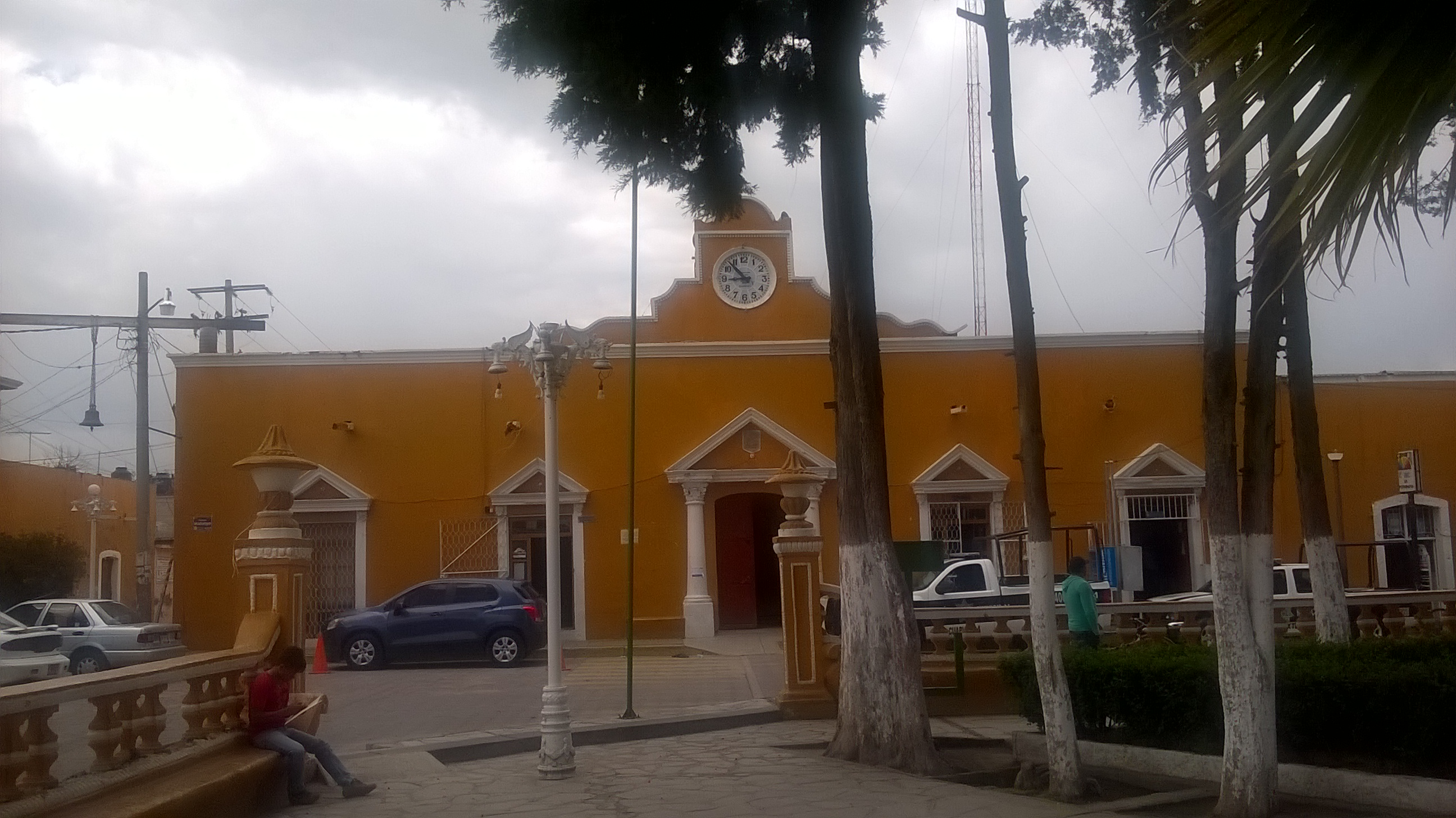
- Cuapiaxtla

- Location within Tlaxcala Location within Mexico
- Coordinates: 19.3355°N 97.7630°W
- Country: Mexico
- State: Tlaxcala
- Municipal seat: Cuapiaxtla
- Time zone: UTC-6 (Central)

Cuapiaxtla is a municipality in the Mexican state of Tlaxcala.
