= San Lucas Tecopilco =

- Municipality
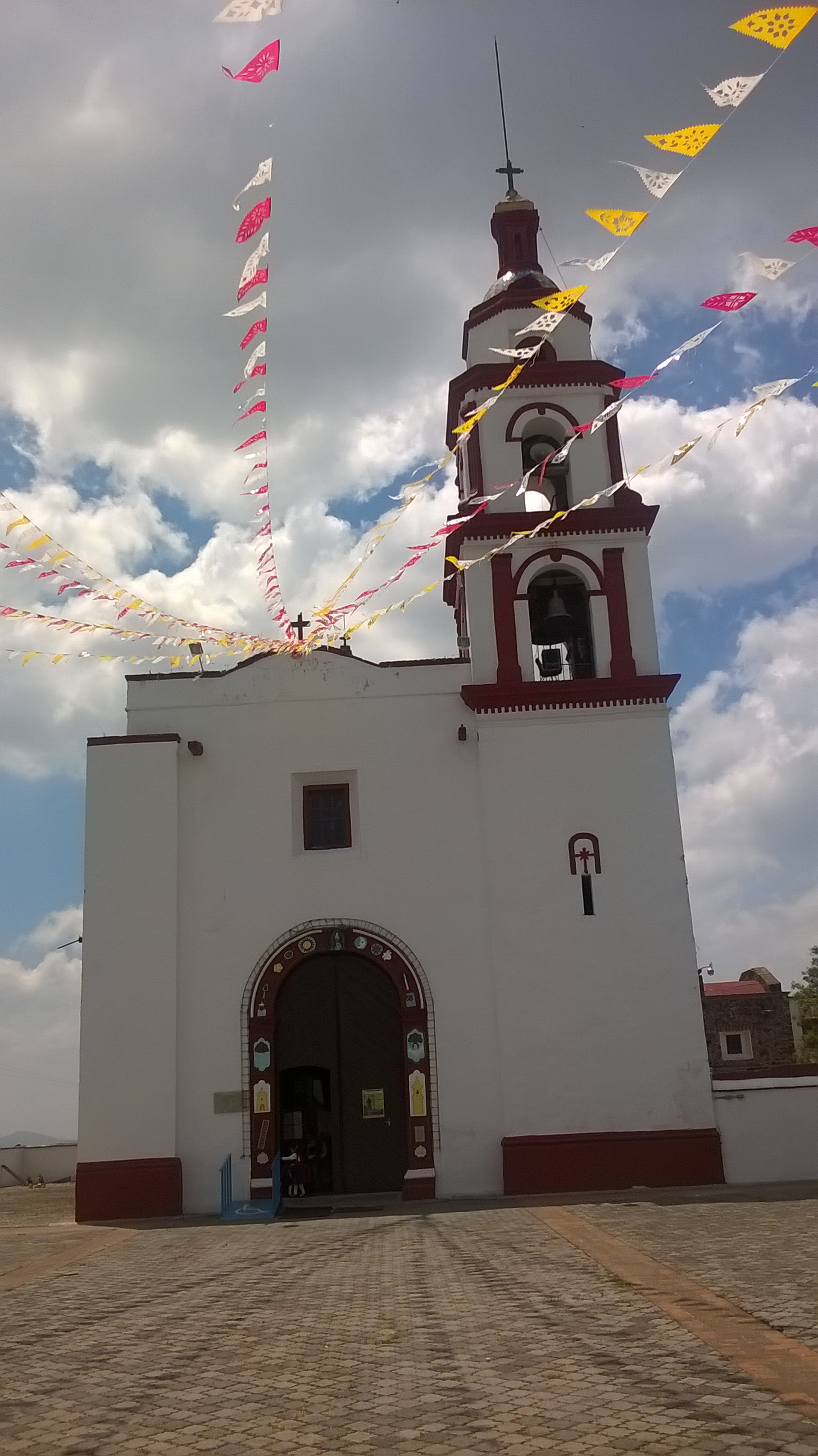
- Church of Saint Lucas

- Location within Tlaxcala Location within Mexico
- Coordinates: 19°28′N 98°15′W
- Country: Mexico
- State: Tlaxcala

Government
  - Mayor: Guadalupe García Cervantes
- Time zone: UTC-6 (Central)

San Lucas Tecopilco is a town and its surrounding municipality in the Mexican state of Tlaxcala.
