= Apetatitlán de Antonio Carvajal =

- Municipality
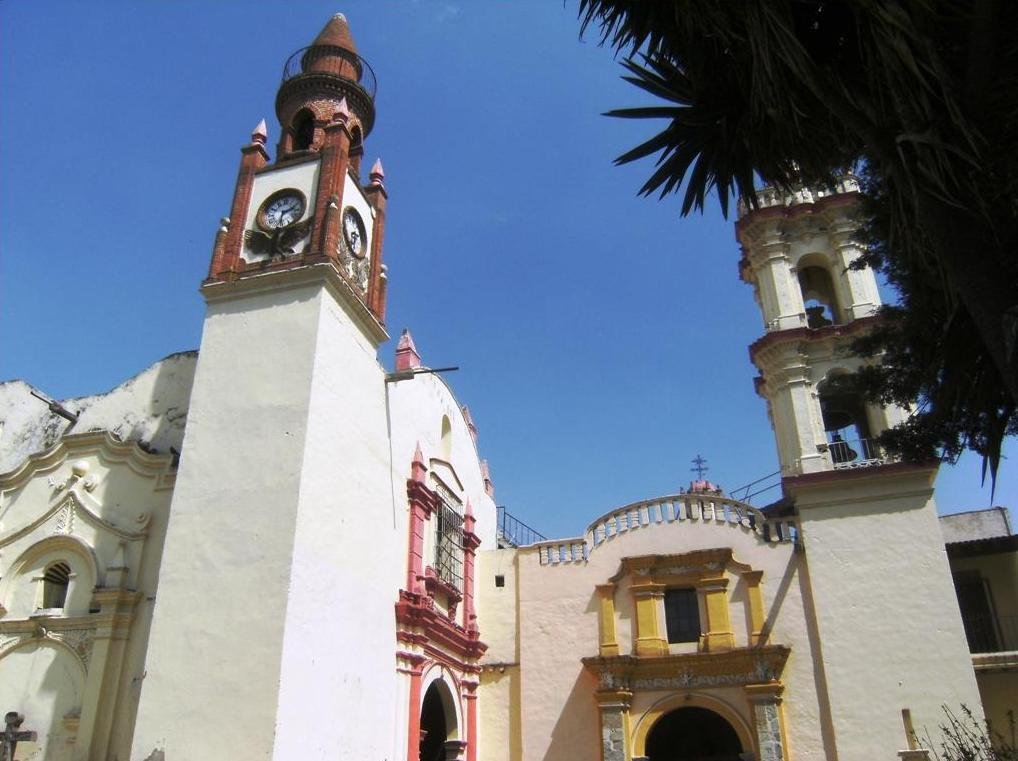

- Location within Tlaxcala Location within Mexico
- Coordinates: 19.3333°N 98.2°W
- Country: Mexico
- State: Tlaxcala
- Time zone: UTC-6 (Central)

Apetatitlán de Antonio Carvajal is a municipality in the Mexican state of Tlaxcala.
