= Nanacamilpa de Mariano Arista =

- Municipality
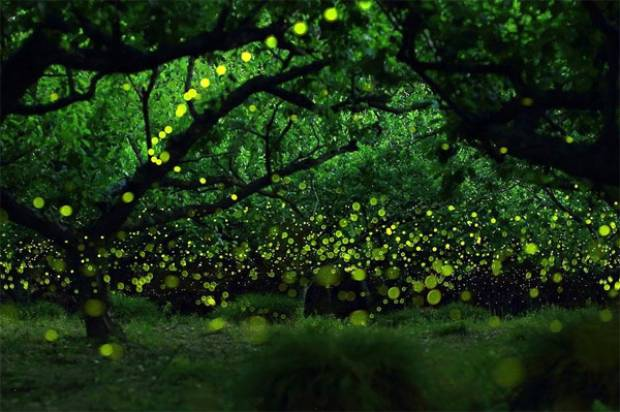
- The municipality's famed firefly display
- Interactive map of Nanacamilpa de Mariano Arista
- Coordinates: 19.4833°N 98.5333°W
- Country: Mexico
- State: Tlaxcala
- Time zone: UTC-6 (Central)

Nanacamilpa de Mariano Arista is a town and its surrounding municipality in the Mexican state of Tlaxcala.
