= Muñoz de Domingo Arenas =

- Municipality
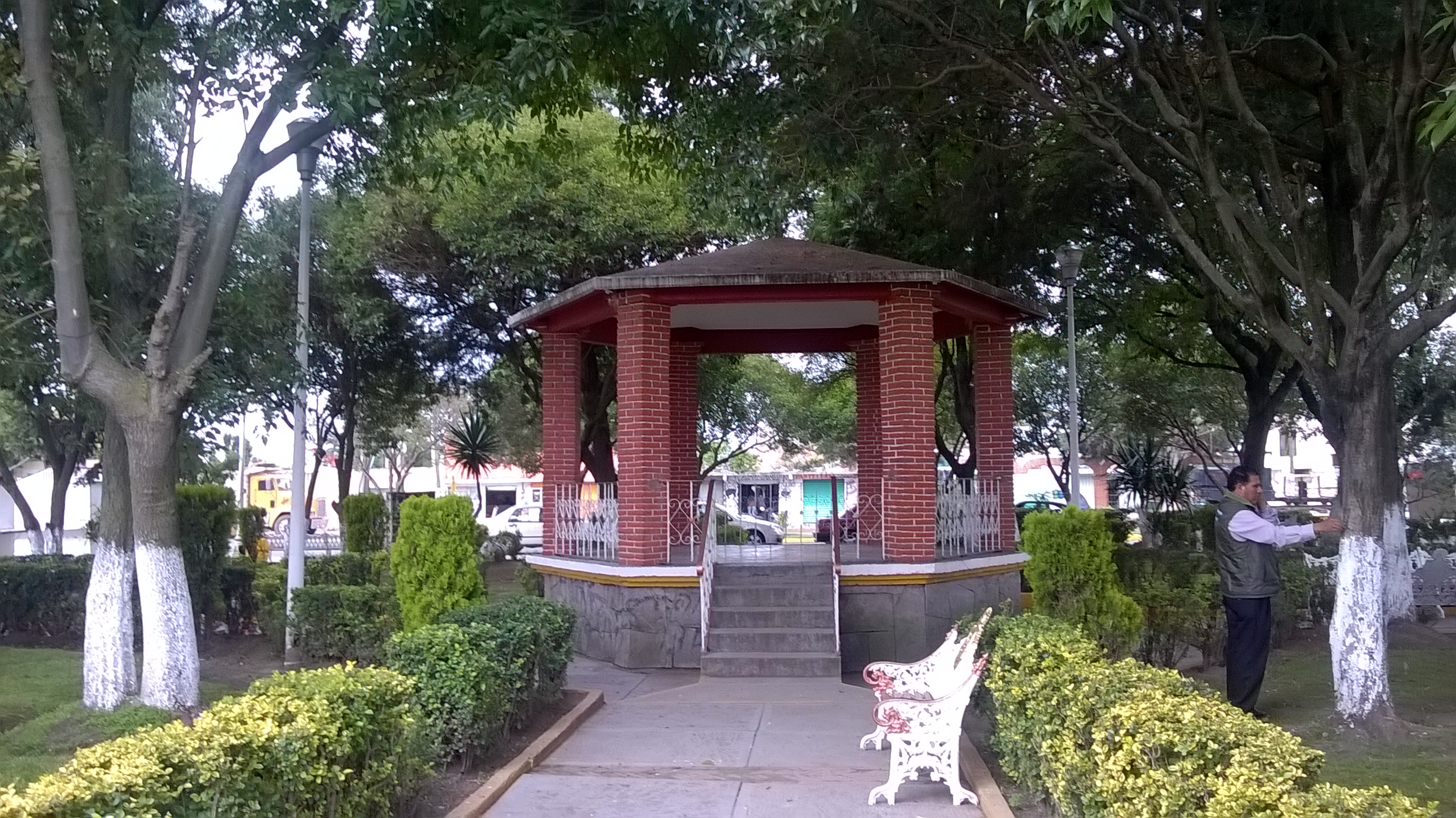

- Location within Tlaxcala Location within Mexico
- Coordinates: 19.4667°N 98.2°W
- Country: Mexico
- State: Tlaxcala
- Time zone: UTC-6 (Central)

Muñoz de Domingo Arenas is a town and its surrounding municipality in the Mexican state of Tlaxcala.
