= Benito Juárez Municipality, Tlaxcala =

Benito Juárez
- Municipality
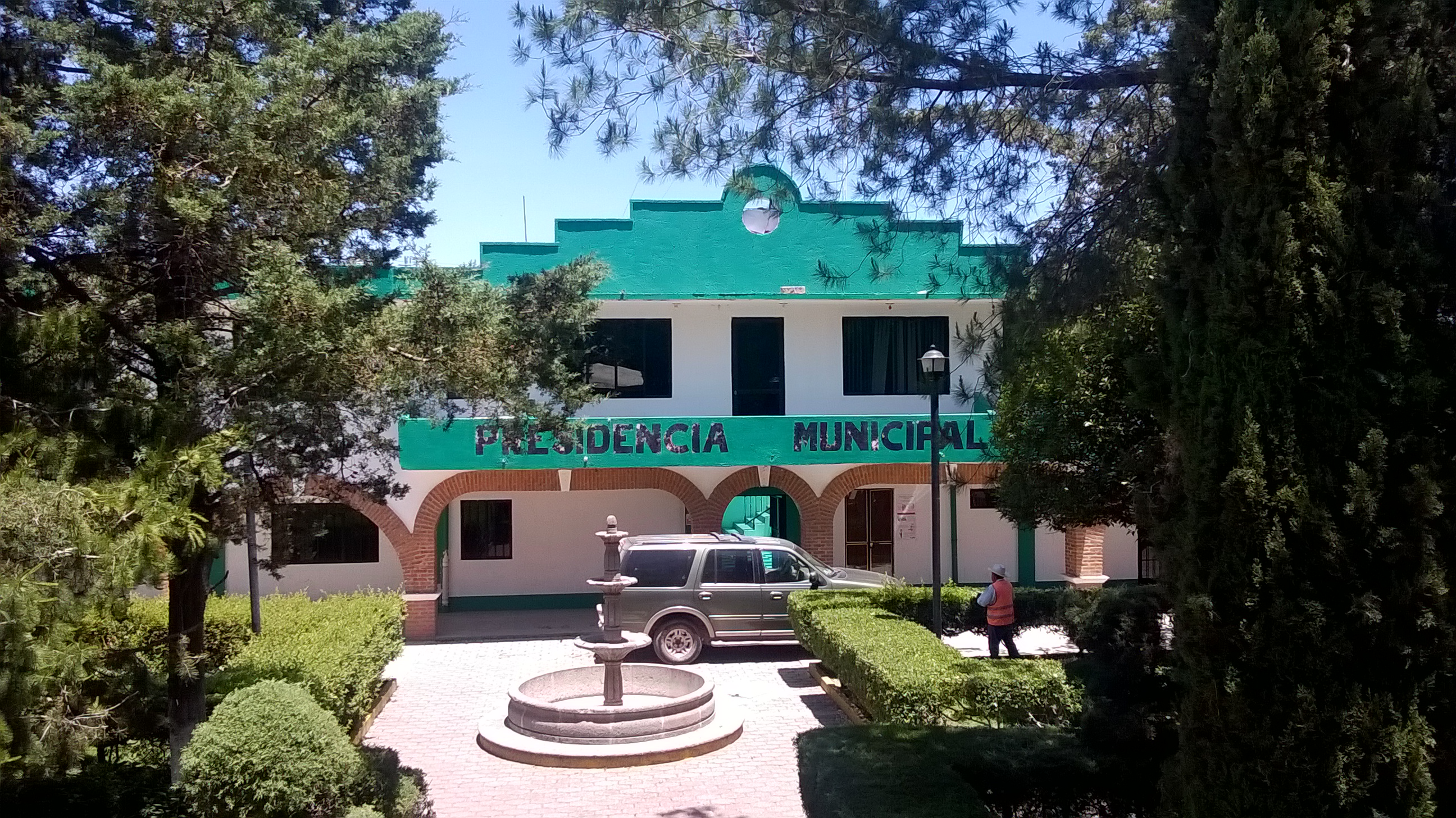

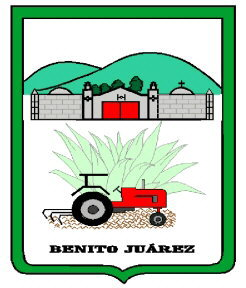
- Coat of arms

- Location within Tlaxcala Location within Mexico
- Coordinates: 19°35′N 98°26′W
- Country: Mexico
- State: Tlaxcala
- Time zone: UTC-6 (Central)

Benito Juárez is a municipality in the Mexican state of Tlaxcala. This municipality was founded in 1995. It used to be a town of the municipality of Sanctórum de Lázaro Cárdenas.
