= Juárez Municipality =

Juárez Municipality may refer to the following places in Mexico:

- Juárez, Chiapas
- Juárez Municipality, Chihuahua
- Juárez Municipality, Coahuila
- Juárez Municipality, Michoacán
- Juárez, Nuevo León

== See also ==
- Benito Juárez Municipality (disambiguation)
