= El Carmen Tequexquitla =

- Municipality
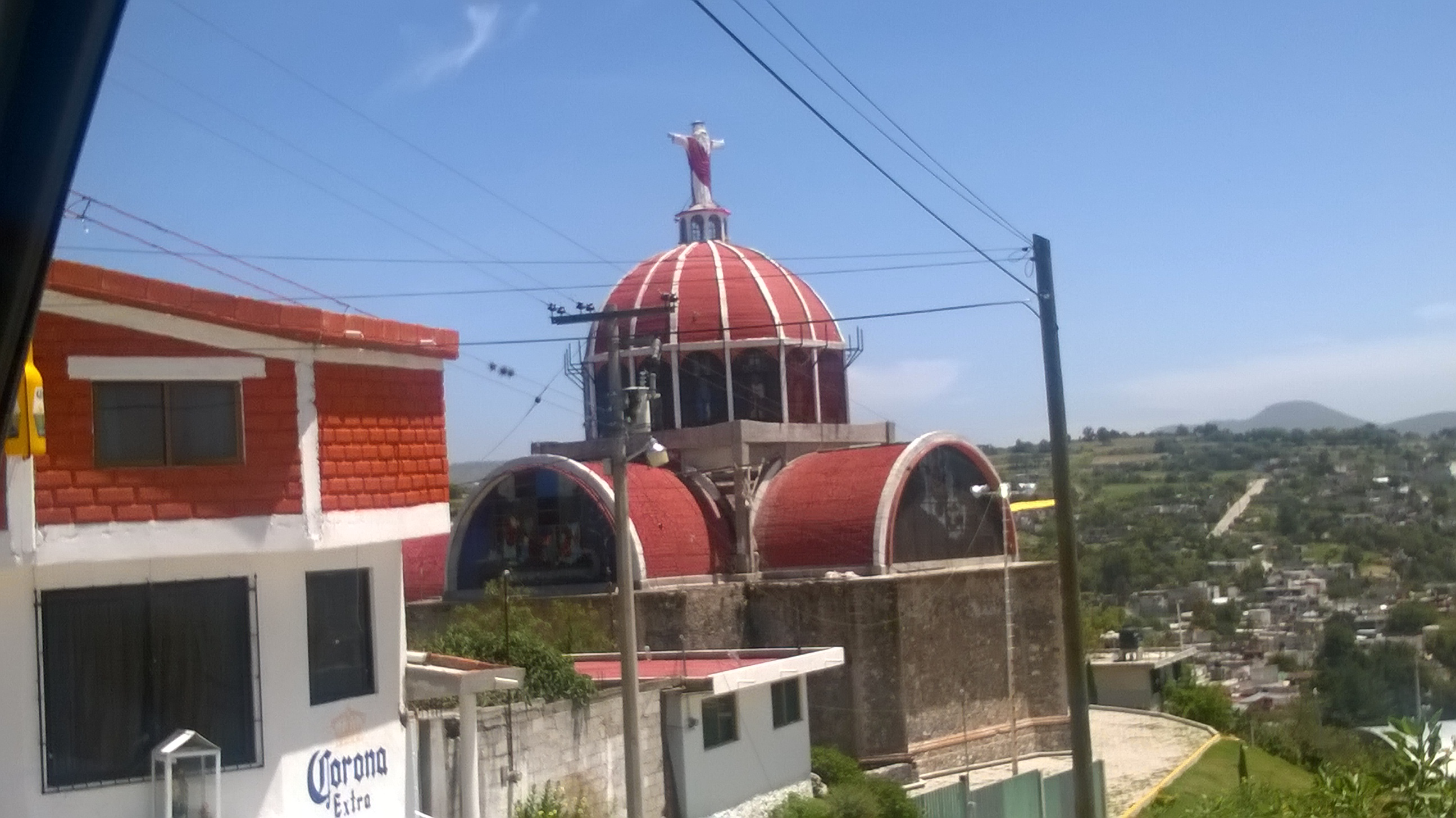

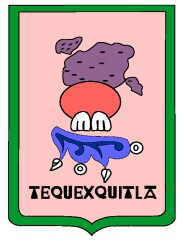
- Coat of arms

- Location within Tlaxcala Location within Mexico
- Coordinates: 19.3167°N 97.65°W
- Country: Mexico
- State: Tlaxcala
- Municipal seat: Villa de El Carmen Tequexquitla
- Time zone: UTC-6 (Central)

El Carmen Tequexquitla is municipality in the Mexican state of Tlaxcala. The municipal seat is at Villa de El Carmen Tequexquitla.
