= Nativitas =

- Municipality
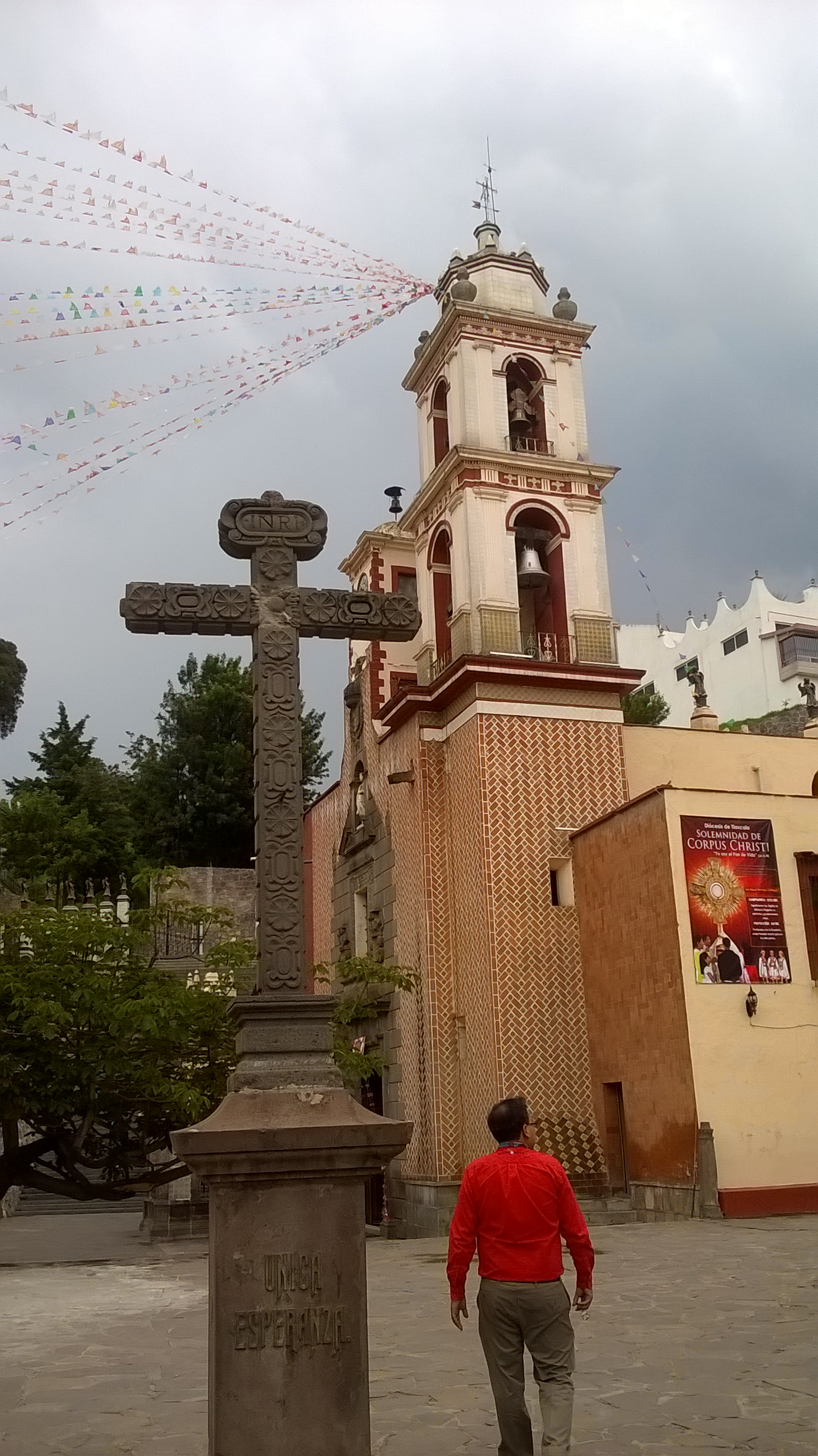

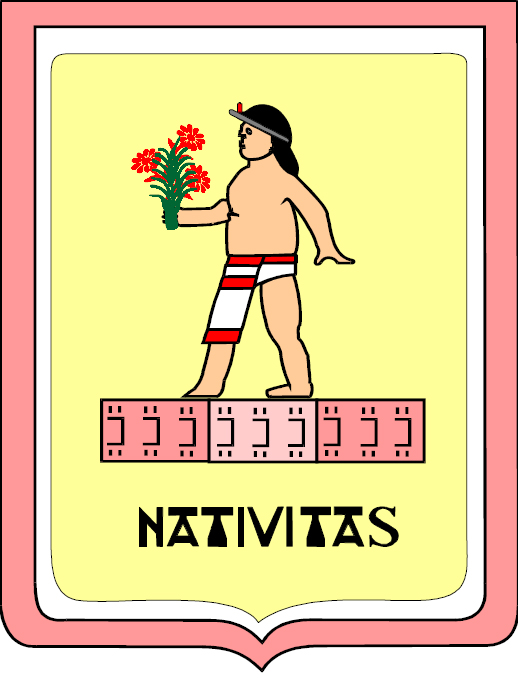
- Coat of arms

- Location within Tlaxcala Location within Mexico
- Coordinates: 19.2361°N 98.3139°W
- Country: Mexico
- State: Tlaxcala

Government
  - Presidente municipal: Carlos García Sampedro
- Time zone: UTC-6 (Central)

Nativitas is a town and its surrounding municipality in the Mexican state of Tlaxcala.
