= Hueyotlipan =

- Municipality
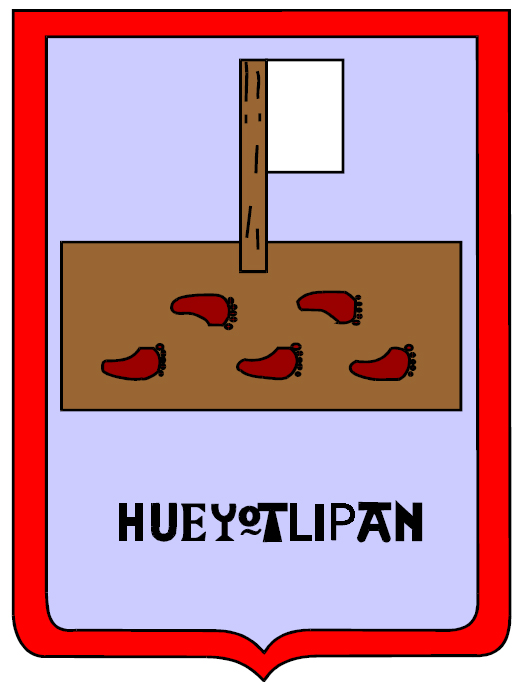
- Coat of arms

- Location within Tlaxcala Location within Mexico
- Coordinates: 19°28′13″N 98°20′48″W
- Country: Mexico
- State: Tlaxcala
- Time zone: UTC-6 (Central)

Hueyotlipan is a town and its surrounding municipality in the Mexican state of Tlaxcala.
