= Santa Cruz Tlaxcala =

- Municipality
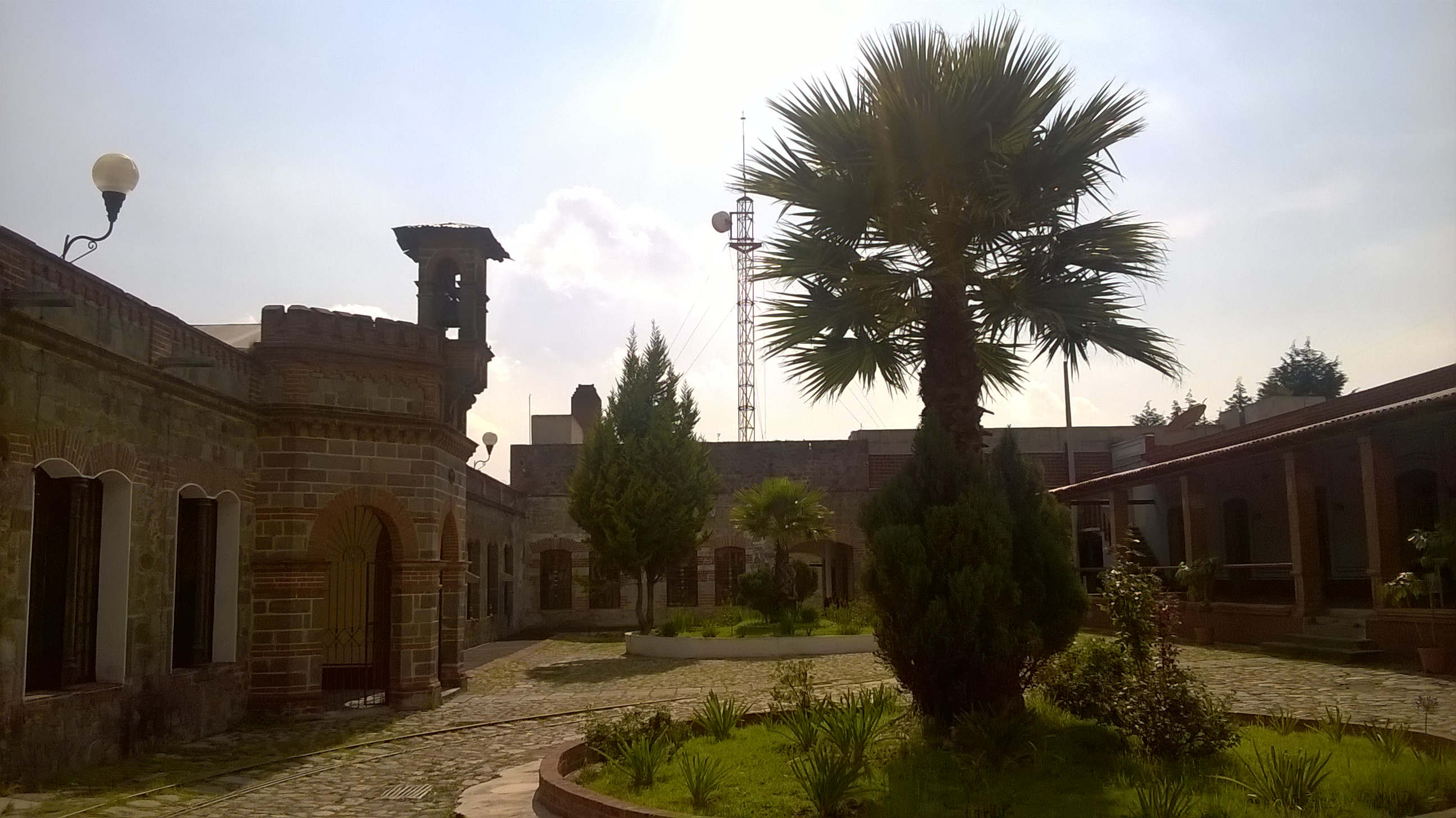
- Ex-factory of St. Manuel

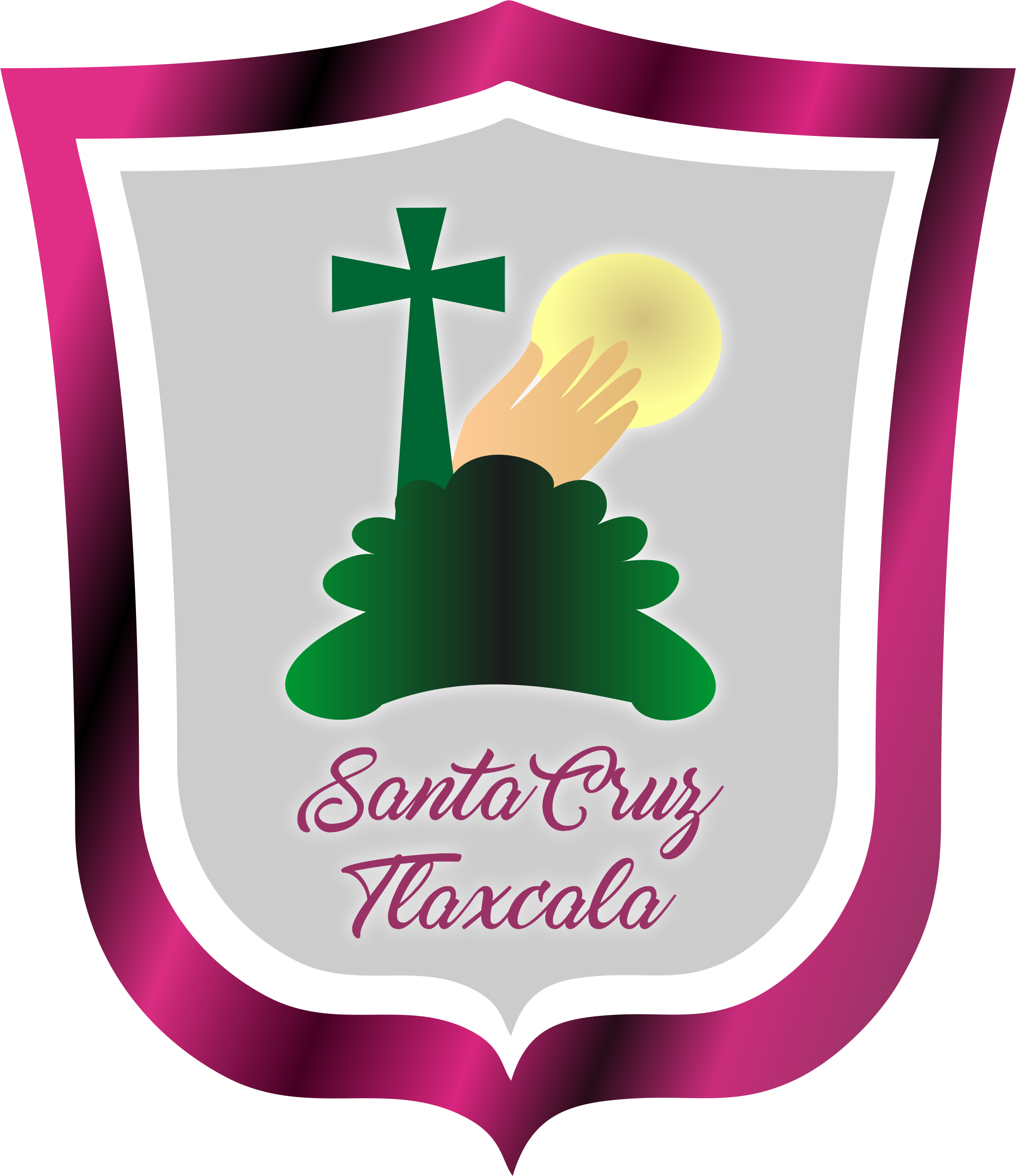
- Coat of arms

- Location within Tlaxcala Location within Mexico
- Coordinates: 19.35°N 98.15°W
- Country: Mexico
- State: Tlaxcala

Government
  - Presidente municipal: Miguel Ángel Sanabria Chávez
- Time zone: UTC-6 (Central)

Santa Cruz Tlaxcala is a town and its surrounding municipality in the Mexican state of Tlaxcala.
