= Ixtacuixtla de Mariano Matamoros =

- Municipality
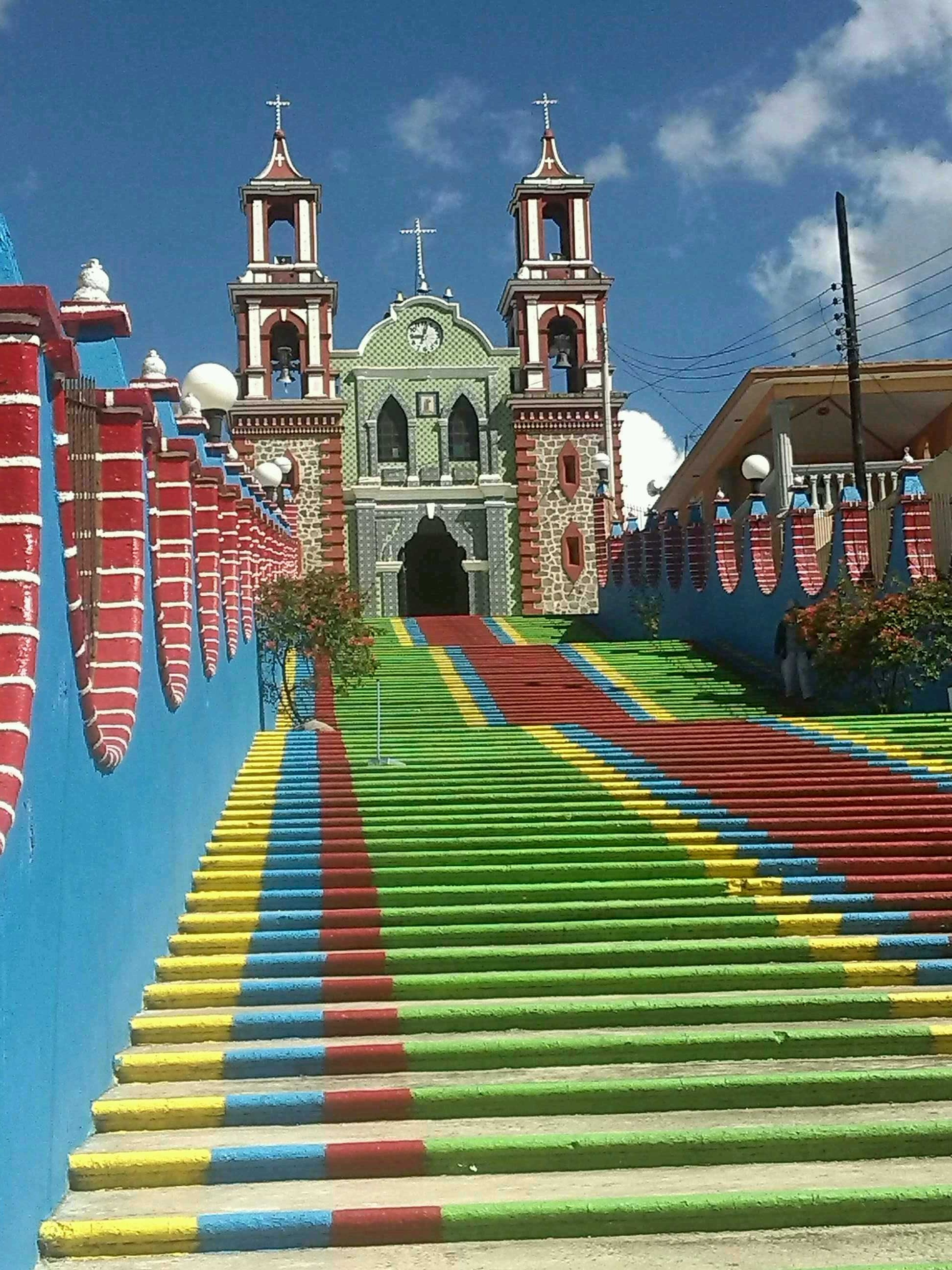

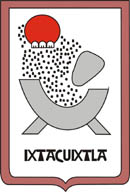
- Coat of arms

- Location within Tlaxcala Location within Mexico
- Coordinates: 19.3253°N 98.3789°W
- Country: Mexico
- State: Tlaxcala
- Time zone: UTC-6 (Central)

Ixtacuixtla de Mariano Matamoros is a municipality in the Mexican state of Tlaxcala. The municipal seat is known as Villa Mariano Matamoros.
