= Sanctórum de Lázaro Cárdenas =

- Municipality
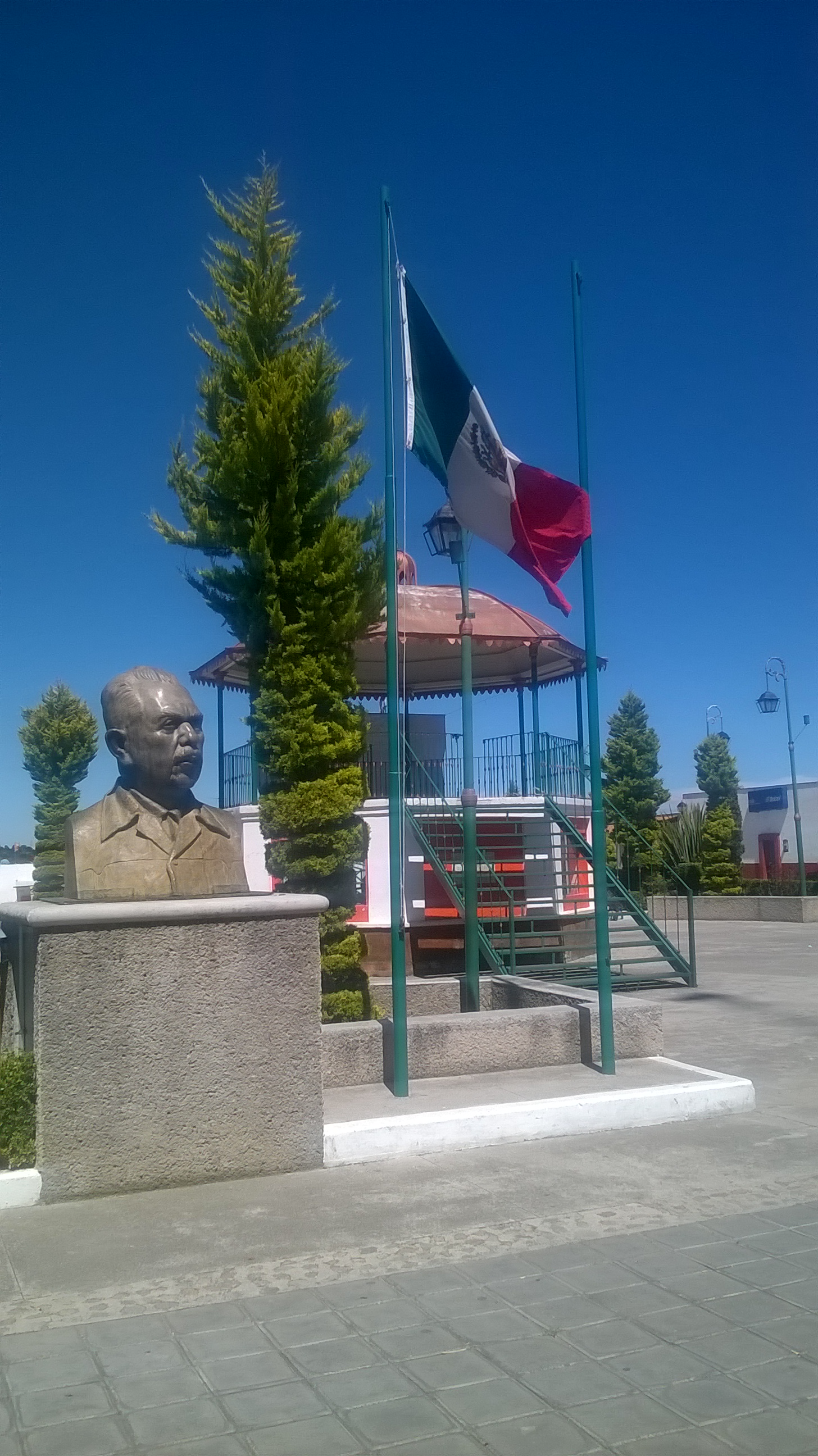
- Sanctórum

- Location within Tlaxcala Location within Mexico
- Coordinates: 19.5008°N 98.4880°W
- Country: Mexico
- State: Tlaxcala
- Time zone: UTC-6 (Central)
- Website: sanctorum.gob.mx/

Sanctórum de Lázaro Cárdenas is a town and its surrounding municipality in the Mexican state of Tlaxcala.
