= Cuaxomulco =

- Town and Municipality
- Location within Tlaxcala Location within Mexico
- Coordinates: 19°21′N 98°06′W
- Country: Mexico
- State: Tlaxcala
- Municipal seat: Cuaxomulco
- Time zone: UTC-6 (Central)
- Website: cuaxomulcotlax.gob.mx/

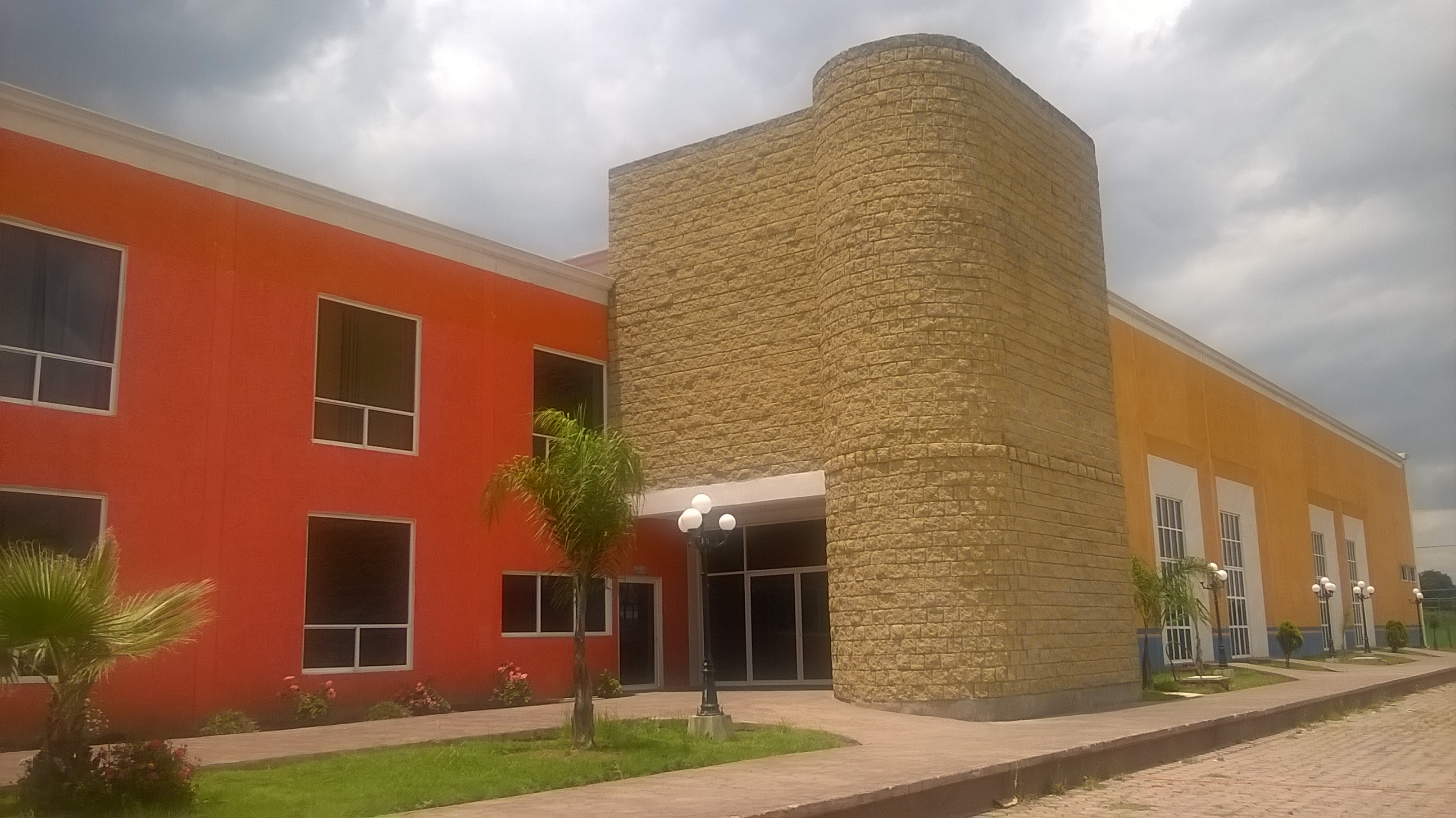
Community center, Cuaxomulco, Tlaxcala

Cuaxomulco is a town and its surrounding municipality in the Mexican state of Tlaxcala.
