= Tocatlán =

- Municipality
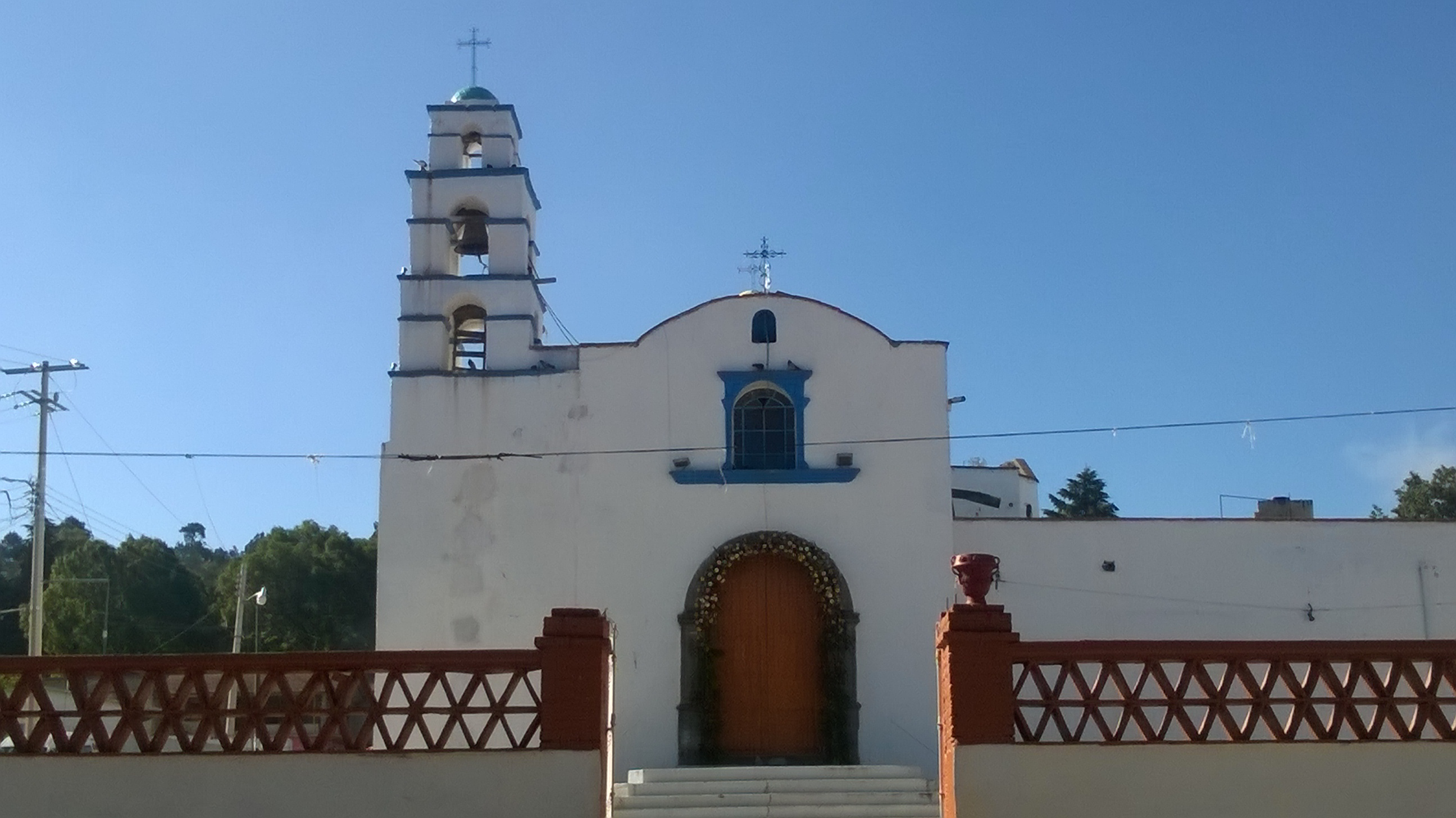

- Location within Tlaxcala Location within Mexico
- Coordinates: 19°23′N 98°01′W
- Country: Mexico
- State: Tlaxcala
- Time zone: UTC-6 (Central)

Tocatlán is a town and its surrounding municipality in the Mexican state of Tlaxcala.

== Climate ==
Climate data for Tocatlán (1951–2010)
| Month | Jan | Feb | Mar | Apr | May | Jun | Jul | Aug | Sep | Oct | Nov | Dec | Year |
|---|---|---|---|---|---|---|---|---|---|---|---|---|---|
| Record high °C (°F) | 25.5 (77.9) | 28.0 (82.4) | 34.0 (93.2) | 31.5 (88.7) | 33.0 (91.4) | 31.0 (87.8) | 27.0 (80.6) | 28.0 (82.4) | 26.0 (78.8) | 28.0 (82.4) | 26.5 (79.7) | 28.0 (82.4) | 34.0 (93.2) |
| Mean daily maximum °C (°F) | 20.2 (68.4) | 22.1 (71.8) | 24.1 (75.4) | 25.2 (77.4) | 25.0 (77.0) | 23.1 (73.6) | 22.0 (71.6) | 22.2 (72.0) | 21.5 (70.7) | 21.3 (70.3) | 20.9 (69.6) | 20.2 (68.4) | 22.3 (72.1) |
| Daily mean °C (°F) | 12.1 (53.8) | 13.5 (56.3) | 15.2 (59.4) | 16.6 (61.9) | 17.0 (62.6) | 16.3 (61.3) | 15.4 (59.7) | 15.5 (59.9) | 15.3 (59.5) | 14.3 (57.7) | 13.3 (55.9) | 12.4 (54.3) | 14.7 (58.5) |
| Mean daily minimum °C (°F) | 4.0 (39.2) | 5.0 (41.0) | 6.3 (43.3) | 8.0 (46.4) | 8.9 (48.0) | 9.6 (49.3) | 8.9 (48.0) | 8.8 (47.8) | 9.1 (48.4) | 7.3 (45.1) | 5.6 (42.1) | 4.6 (40.3) | 7.2 (45.0) |
| Record low °C (°F) | −5.0 (23.0) | −2.0 (28.4) | −3.0 (26.6) | 2.0 (35.6) | 3.0 (37.4) | 5.0 (41.0) | 5.0 (41.0) | 5.0 (41.0) | 3.0 (37.4) | −1.0 (30.2) | −3.0 (26.6) | −4.0 (24.8) | −5.0 (23.0) |
| Average precipitation mm (inches) | 8.5 (0.33) | 9.4 (0.37) | 15.1 (0.59) | 45.0 (1.77) | 84.0 (3.31) | 143.2 (5.64) | 117.9 (4.64) | 119.8 (4.72) | 107.0 (4.21) | 50.1 (1.97) | 14.2 (0.56) | 6.5 (0.26) | 720.7 (28.37) |
| Average precipitation days (≥ 0.1 mm) | 1.5 | 1.6 | 2.9 | 6.7 | 11.1 | 14.4 | 14.0 | 13.7 | 12.7 | 6.5 | 2.4 | 1.1 | 88.6 |
Source: Servicio Meteorologico Nacional
