= Santa Apolonia Teacalco =

- Municipality
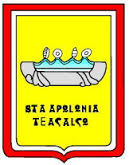
- Coat of arms

- Location within Tlaxcala Location within Mexico
- Coordinates: 19°15′N 98°18′W
- Country: Mexico
- State: Tlaxcala
- Time zone: UTC-6 (Central)

Santa Apolonia Teacalco is a town and its surrounding municipality in the Mexican state of Tlaxcala.
