= Contla =

Two villages in Tlaxcala, Mexico

Contla consists of two nearby villages in the Mexican state of Tlaxcala.

One village is also called San Bernardino Contla or simply San Bernardino, and is located at 19°20′N 98°10′W

The other village is also called San Miguel Contla or San Miguel, and is located at 19°11′50″N 98°12′00″W
