= San Francisco Tetlanohcan =

Town in Mexico

Coordinates: 19.260°N 98.164°W

- Municipality

- Location in Mexico San Francisco Tetlanohcan (Mexico)
- Country: Mexico
- State: Tlaxcala
- Demonym: (in Spanish)
- Time zone: UTC−6 (CST)

San Francisco Tetlanohcan is a town in the Mexican state of Tlaxcala, at the foot of the La Malinche dormant volcano. San Francisco Tetlanohcan has a population of 10,000 inhabitants, and is located about 20 minutes east of the state capital, Tlaxcala, Tlaxcala.

San Francisco Tetlanohcan has a flower-covered cemetery.

The Main Square of San Francisco Tetlanohcan

== See also ==
- La Malinche
- Tlaxcala
