= 3rd federal electoral district of Tlaxcala =

Federal electoral district of Mexico

Tlaxcala's 3rd
- Electoral district of the Chamber of Deputies of Mexico

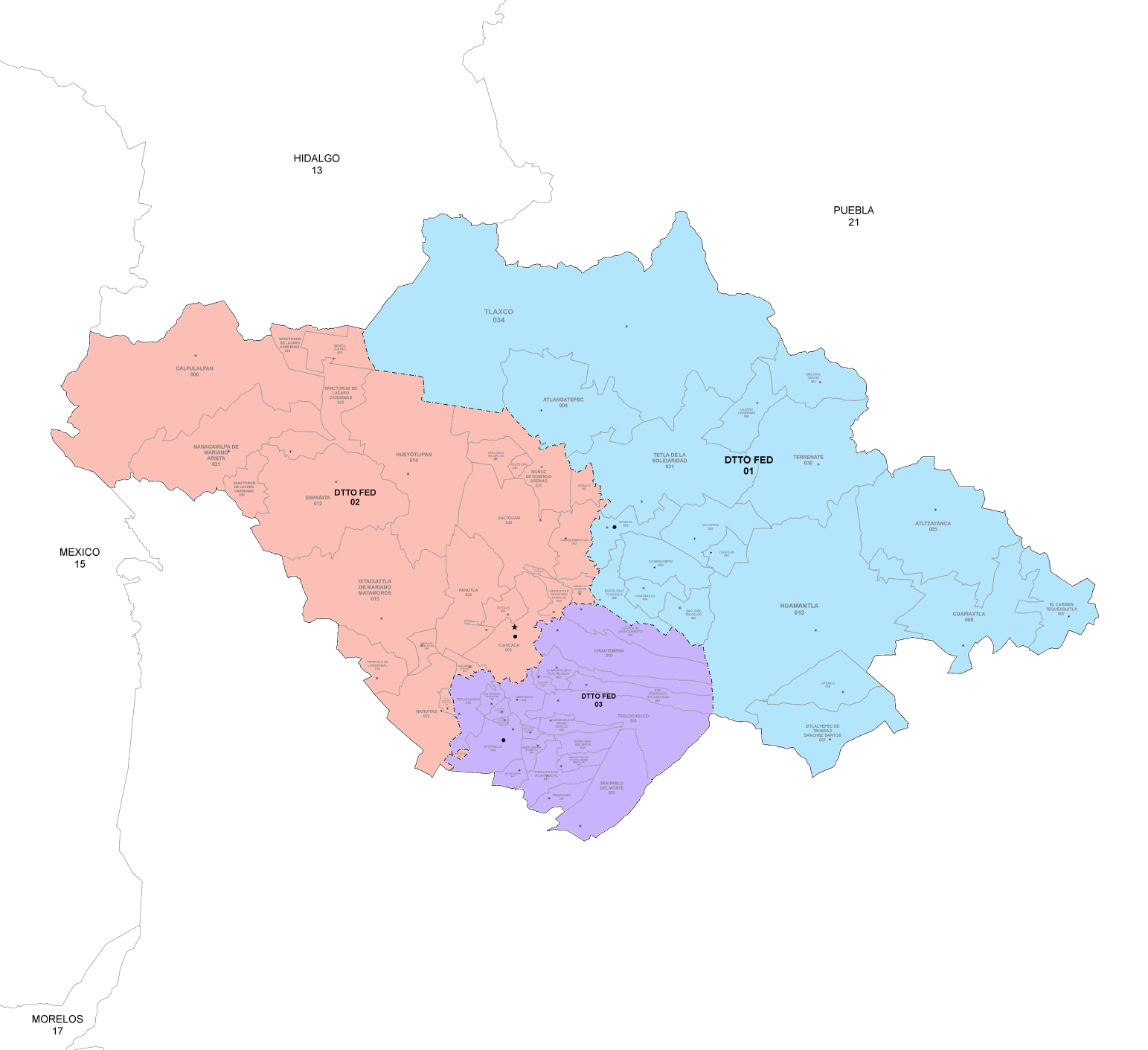
- 3rd district since 2023

Incumbent
- Member: Irma Yordana Garay Loredo
- Party: ▌Labour Party
- Congress: 66th (2024–2027)

District
- State: Tlaxcala
- Head town: Zacatelco
- Coordinates: 19°13′N 98°14′W
- Covers: 20 municipalities: Acuamanala, Axocomanitla, Ayometla, Chiautempan, Contla, Huactzinco, Mazatecochco, Papalotla, San Pablo del Monte, Quilehtla, Tenancingo, Teolocholco, Tepeyanco, Tetlatlahuca, Tetlanohcan, Tlaltelulco, Xicohtzinco, Xiloxoxtla, Zacatelco, Zacualpan
- PR region: Fourth
- Precincts: 158
- Population: 440,739 (2020 census)

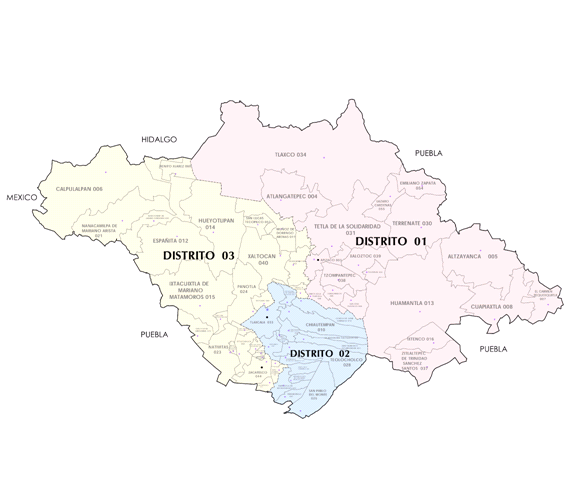
Tlaxcala under the 2017–2022 districting plan

The 3rd federal electoral district of Tlaxcala (Spanish: Distrito electoral federal 03 de Tlaxcala) is one of the 300 electoral districts into which Mexico is divided for elections to the federal Chamber of Deputies and one of three such districts in the state of Tlaxcala.

It elects one deputy to the lower house of Congress for each three-year legislative period, by means of the first-past-the-post system. Votes cast in the district also count towards the calculation of proportional representation ("plurinominal") deputies elected from the fourth region.

Dissolved in 1930, (Note: An amendment to Article 52 of the Constitution in 1928 changed the original provision of "one deputy per 60,000 inhabitants" to "one deputy per 100,000"; as a result, the size of the Chamber of Deputies fell from 281 in the 1928 election to 171 in 1934.) the 3rd district was re-established by the Federal Electoral Institute (IFE) in its 1996 redistricting process.

The current member for the district, elected in the 2024 general election, is Irma Yordana Garay Loredo of the Labour Party (PT).

== District territory ==
Under the 2023 districting plan adopted by the National Electoral Institute (INE), which is to be used for the 2024, 2027 and 2030 federal elections, Tlaxcala's 3rd covers 158 electoral precincts (secciones electorales) across 20 of the state's southern municipalities:

- Acuamanala, Axocomanitla, Ayometla, Chiautempan, Contla, Huactzinco, Mazatecochco, Papalotla, San Pablo del Monte, Quilehtla, Tenancingo, Teolocholco, Tepeyanco, Tetlatlahuca, Tetlanohcan, Tlaltelulco, Xicohtzinco, Xiloxoxtla, Zacatelco and Zacualpan.

The head town (cabecera distrital), where results from individual polling stations are gathered together and tallied, is the city of Zacatelco. The district reported a population of 440,739 in the 2020 census.

== Previous districting schemes ==
Evolution of electoral district numbers
	1974	1978	1996	2005	2017	2023
Tlaxcala	2	2	3	3	3	3
Chamber of Deputies	196	300				

2017–2022

From 2017 to 2022, the head town was at Zacatelco and the district covered 28 municipalities.

== Deputies returned to Congress ==
(Mexico) National parties
- Current
- PAN
- PRI
- PT
- PVEM
- MC
- Morena
- PAZ
- Somos
- Defunct or local only
- PLM
- PNR
- PRM
- PNM
- PP
- PPS
- PARM
- PFCRN
- CON
- PANAL
- PSD
- PES
- PES
- PRD

Tlaxcala's 3rd district
Election	Deputy	Party	Term	Legislature
1916	Ascención Tépal		1916–1917	Constituent Congress of Querétaro
1917	Marcelo Portillo		1917–1918	27th Congress
1918	Galindo Modesto González		1918–1920	28th Congress
1920	Macario M. Hernández	PLCT	1920–1922	29th Congress
1922	Macario M. Hernández		1922–1924	30th Congress
1924	Eduardo Fernández de Lara		1924–1926	31st Congress
1926	Inés Aguilar		1926–1928	32nd Congress
1928	Mauro Angulo		1928–1930	33rd Congress
The 3rd district was suspended between 1930 and 1997
1997	Martha Palafox Gutiérrez	Institutional Revolutionary Party	1997–2000	57th Congress
2000	Albino Mendieta Cuapio	Institutional Revolutionary Party	2000–2003	58th Congress
2003	Federico Barbosa Gutiérrez	Institutional Revolutionary Party	2003–2006	59th Congress
2006	Alberto Amaro Corona	Party of the Democratic Revolution	2006–2009	60th Congress
2009	Perla López Loyo	National Action Party (Mexico)	2009–2012	61st Congress
2012	Edilberto Algredo Jaramillo	Party of the Democratic Revolution	2012–2015	62nd Congress
2015	Ricardo David García Portilla	Institutional Revolutionary Party	2015–2018	63rd Congress
2018	Lorena Cuéllar Cisneros (Note: Took leave of her seat to serve as the state's coordinator of development programmes. Replaced by her substitute, Claudia Pérez Rodríguez, for the remainder of her term.); Claudia Pérez Rodríguez	National Regeneration Movement	2018; 2018–2021	64th Congress
2021	Carlos Augusto Pérez Hernández	National Regeneration Movement	2021–2024	65th Congress
2024	Irma Yordana Garay Loredo	Labour Party (Mexico)	2024–2027	66th Congress

== Presidential elections ==
Tlaxcala's 3rd district
Election	District won by	Party or coalition	%
2018	Andrés Manuel López Obrador	Juntos Haremos Historia	73.7279
2024	Claudia Sheinbaum Pardo	Sigamos Haciendo Historia	72.4885
