= Metropolitan area of Puebla =

Puebla Metropolitan Area
- Metropolitan Area
- Puebla–Tlaxcala Metropolitan Area
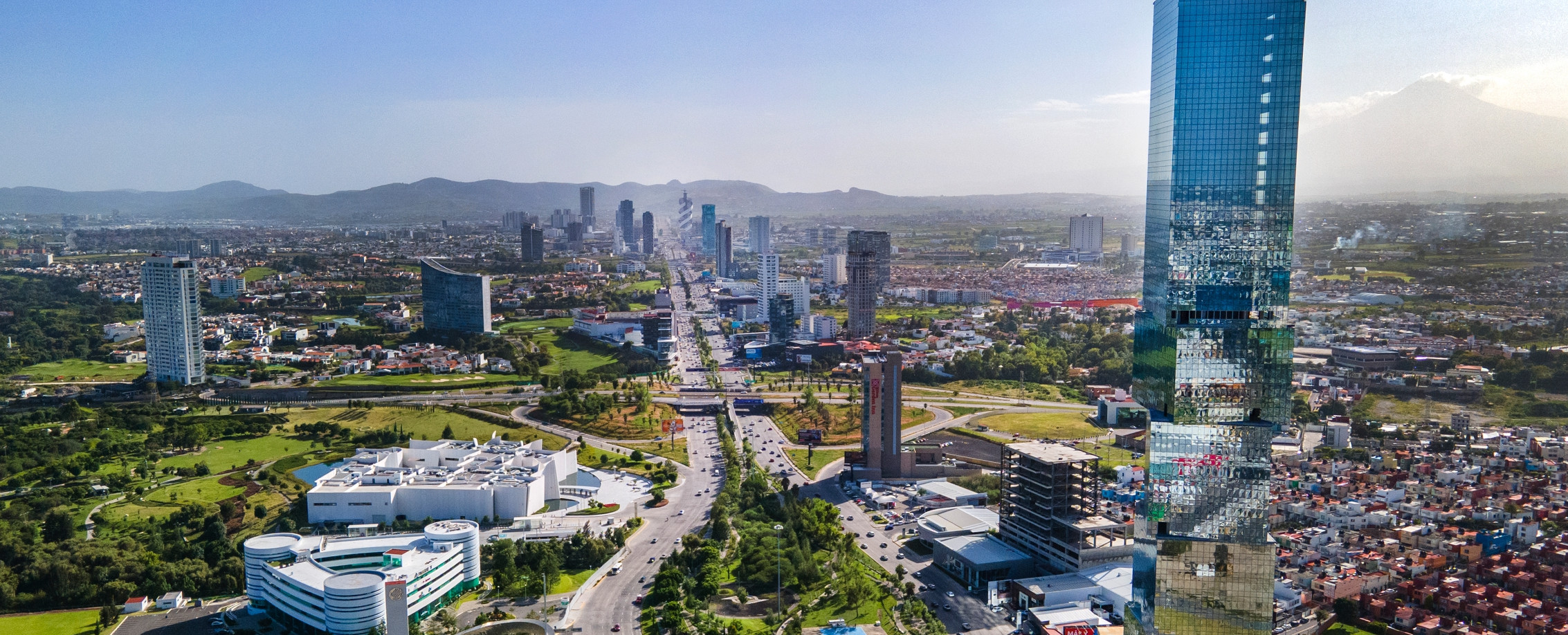
- Skyline of Puebla
Interactive Map of Puebla Metropolitan Area
City of Puebla / Ciudad de Puebla
Puebla Metro Area / Zona Metropolitana
- Country: Mexico
- State(s): Puebla; Tlaxcala
- Largest city: Puebla
- Other cities: Amozoc; Coronango; Cuautlancingo; San Pedro Cholula; San Andrés Cholula; Zacatelco; Vicente Guerrero

Area
  - Total: 1,628 km^{2} (629 sq mi)

Population
  - Total: 3,199,530
  - Density: 1,965/km^{2} (5,090/sq mi)

GDP (PPP, constant 2015 values)
  - Year: 2023
  - Total: $53.8 billion
  - Per capita: $16,100
- Time zone: UTC−6 (CST)

The Metropolitan area of Puebla or Greater Puebla is the fourth largest agglomeration in Mexico with a population of 3.199 million. This agglomeration includes 10 municipalities of the state of Puebla, and 13 municipalities of the state of Tlaxcala. It does not include the city of Tlaxcala.

According to the National Institute of Statistics, Geography, and Data Processing (INEGI), it consists of the following municipalities of the State of Puebla:

- Amozoc
- Coronango
- Cuautlancingo
- Juan C. Bonilla
- Ocoyucan
- Puebla
- San Andrés Cholula
- San Gregorio Atzompa
- San Miguel Xoxtla
- San Pedro Cholula

and the following municipalities of the State of Tlaxcala:

- Mazatecochco de José María Morelos
- Acuamanala de Miguel Hidalgo
- San Pablo del Monte
- Tenancingo
- Teolocholco
- Tepeyanco
- Papalotla de Xicohténcatl
- Xicohtzinco
- Zacatelco
- San Juan Huactzinco
- San Lorenzo Axocomanitla
- Santa Catarina Ayometla
- Santa Cruz Quilehtla

It may be considered one of the oldest inhabited areas in the world, as it includes the city of Cholula, the oldest still-inhabited city in America.

== See also ==
- Metropolitan Areas of Mexico
