= 2011 Pan American Games torch relay =

- Host city: Guadalajara, Mexico
- Distance: 15,000 km
- Torch bearers: 3,500
- Start date: August 26, 2011
- End date: October 14, 2011

The 2011 Pan American Games torch relay was a 50-day torch run, from August 26–October 14, 2011, held prior to the 2011 Pan American Games. Plans for the relay were originally announced July 6, 2011 by the Guadalajara Organizing Committee for the 2011 Pan American and Parapan American Games (COPAG). The relay brought the torch from Mexico City to the Estadio Omnilife for the Opening Ceremony. The flame arrived just in time for the opening ceremony.

The relay took the torch through all 32 Mexican states on a 50-day route starting on August 26, 2011, at the pyramids of Teotihuacan outside Mexico City. The Pan American flame was lit in the Pyramid of the Sun, the spot selected by the Pan American Sports Organization (PASO). The relay was organized by the Mexican Olympic Committee and was sponsored by Grupo Omnilife, a nutrition company. The first torch was carried by Pan American Games gold medalist Paola Longoria. The relay began with a moment of silence in honor of the victims of the 2011 Monterrey casino attack. About 3,500 runners carried the torch on the 15,000-kilometer route. The torch arrived in Puerto Vallarta on October 9, Ciudad Guzmán on October 11, Tapalpa on October 12, Lagos de Moreno on October 13 and Guadalajara on October 14 for the opening ceremony at the Estadio Omnilife.

The torch was designed by Vatti, the same company that designed the torch for the 2008 Summer Olympics. The design depicted green agave leaves with blue and white accents. The leaves surrounded and protected the flame. Each torch was 70 centimetres (28 in) tall and weighed 1.5 kilograms (3.3 lb), including the fuel canister, which contained enough fuel for 12 minutes.

== Route ==
Route
Day	Date	State	Cities	Notable torchbearers	# of torchbearers
1	August 26	Mexican Federal District	Teotihuacan (Torch lighting ceremony)	–	–
2	August 27	Mexican Federal District	Mexico City (all 16 boroughs)	Paola Longoria – racquetballer Daniel Aceves – wrestler Noé Hernández, Carlos Mercenario – athlete (race walker); Jesús Mena, Fernando Platas – diver Marcelo Ebrard, Bernardo de la Garza – politicians Mario González – boxer Guillermo Pérez – taekwondoist	240
3	August 28	State of Mexico	Toluca	Antônio Naelson, Alfredo Talavera – footballer Ana Maria Torres – boxer María del Carmen Díaz, Fidel Negrete – athlete (marathon); Víctor Estrada – taekwondoist	66
4	August 29	Hidalgo	Pachuca	Nabor Castillo – judoka Jose Francisco Olvera Ruiz – Governor of Hidalgo; Eligio Cervantes – triathlete	73
5	August 30	Tlaxcala	Papalotla, Xicohtzinco, Zacatelco, Tepeyanco and Tlaxcala	Braulio Ávila – boxer	96
6	August 31	Puebla	Puebla	–	77
7	September 1	Veracruz	Xalapa	Manuel Cortina – canoer Armando Fernández – wrestler	67
8	September 2	Not travelling			
9	September 3	Tabasco	Villahermosa	–	72
10	September 4	Campeche	Campeche	Melchor Cob Castro – boxer Francisco Campos – baseball player paz	61
11	September 5	Yucatán	Mérida, Dzibilchaltún	Guty Espadas, Juan Herrera, Gilberto Keb Baas, José Pinzón – boxer Eduardo Magaña – archer Gerardo Torres – footballer Juan Jose Pacho – baseball player	73
12	September 6	Yucatán	Chichen Itza, Pisté	David Mier – sailor	39
13	September 7	Quintana Roo	Cancún	Alejandro Vela – footballer Ricardo Delgado, Rodolfo López – boxer Marco Martos – American football player Roberto Borge Angulo – Governor of Quintana Roo	61
14	September 8	Quintana Roo	Chetumal	Carolina Valencia – weightlifter	57
15	September 9	Not travelling			
16	September 10	Chiapas	Chiapa de Corzo, Tuxtla Gutiérrez	–	52
17	September 11	Not travelling			
18	September 12	Oaxaca	Oaxaca	Bernardo Segura – athlete (race walker)	57
19	September 13	Guerrero	Acapulco	–	55
20	September 14	Morelos	Cuernavaca	–	78
21	September 15	Querétaro	Querétaro	–	71
22	September 16	Not travelling			
23	September 17	Michoacán	Morelia	Leonel Godoy Rangel – Governor of Michoacán; Guillermo Pérez – taekwondoist Everardo Cristóbal – canoer	70
24	September 18	Guanajuato	León	Laura Sánchez – diver	97
25	September 19	Aguascalientes	Aguascalientes	Alfonso Zamora – boxer	63
26	September 20	Not travelling			
27	September 21	San Luis Potosí	San Luis Potosí	Armando Quintanilla – athlete (5,000 + 10,000 meters)	133
28	September 22	Tamaulipas	Tampico, Ciudad Madero, Altamira	–	96
29	September 23	Not travelling			
30	September 24	Nuevo León	Monterrey	Daniel Bautista – athlete (race walker); Raúl Alcalá – cyclist Antonio Sancho – footballer	68
31	September 25	Coahuila	Saltillo	–	40
32	September 26	Durango/Coahuila	Gómez Palacio, Lerdo, Torreón	Jared Borgetti – footballer Cristian Mijares – boxer Marco Antonio Rubio – boxer	64
33	September 27	Not travelling			
34	September 28	Chihuahua	Chihuahua	Cristián Bejarano – boxer	88
35	September 29	Not travelling			
36	September 30	Sonora	Hermosillo	Humberto Cota – baseball player Juan Pedro Toledo – athlete	80
37	October 1	Not travelling			
38	October 2	Baja California	Tijuana	Erik Morales – boxer	100
39	October 3	Not travelling			
40	October 4	Baja California Sur	La Paz	–	73
41	October 5	Not travelling			
42	October 6	Sinaloa	Mazatlán	–	97
43	October 7	Nayarit	Tepic	–	49
44	October 8	Jalisco	Puerto Vallarta	–	103
45	October 9	Not travelling			
46	October 10	Colima	Colima	–	68
47	October 11	Jalisco	Ciudad Guzmán	–	75
48	October 12	Jalisco	Tapalpa	–	17
49	October 13	Jalisco	Amatitán, Lagos de Moreno	–	66
50	October 14	Jalisco	Guadalajara, Tonalá, Tlaquepaque, Zapopan	Jashia Luna – diver Brenda Magaña – gymnast Dionicio Cerón – athlete (marathon); Javier Rosas – triathlete Jose Becerra – boxer	185
