= Autonomous University of Tlaxcala =

University in Mexico

- Universidad Autónoma de Tlaxcala
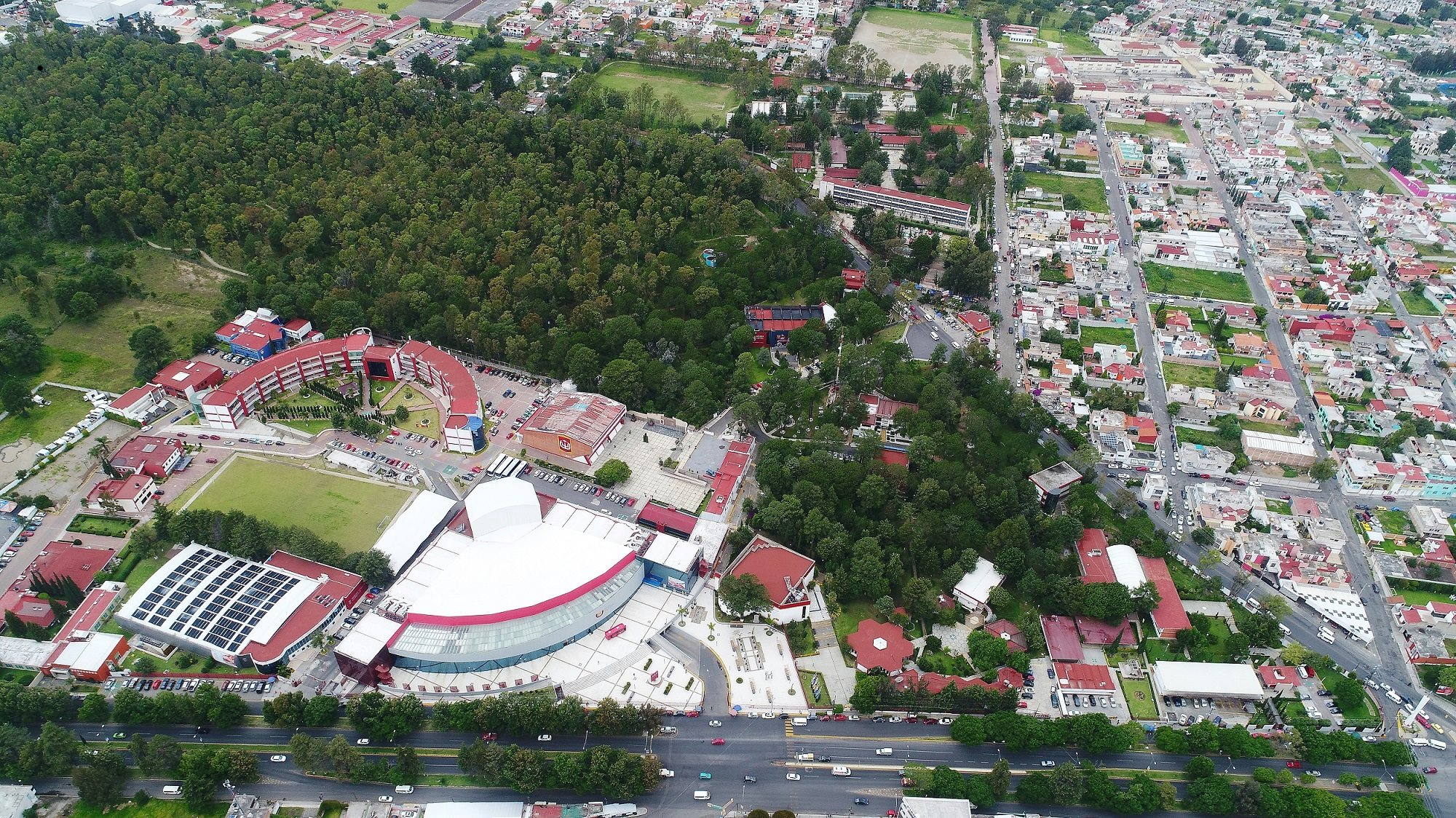
- Motto: Por la cultura, a la justicia social.
- Type: Public university
- Established: 20 November 1976
- Affiliations: CUMEX, ANUIES, ECOSAD, CONACYT, SEP, CONAHEC
- Academic affiliations: ANUIES, CUMEX, CONAHEC
- Rector: Serafin Ortiz Ortiz
- Students: 18,000
- Location: Av. Universidad #1, Col. La Loma Xicohténcatl, Tlaxcala, Tlaxcala, Mexico; 19.3022°N 98.2434°W
- Campus: Apizaco, Contla, Huamantla, Ixtacuixtla, Tlaxco, Zacatelco, Calpulalpan, San Pablo del Monte, Teacalco, Amaxac
- Colors
- Mascot: The heron
- Website: www.uatx.mx
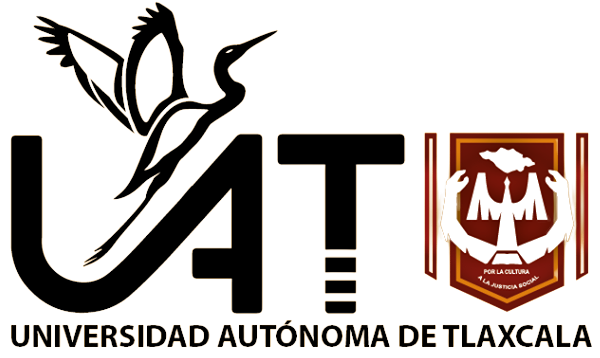

The Autonomous University of Tlaxcala (in Spanish: Universidad Autónoma de Tlaxcala) is a Mexican public university based in the state of Tlaxcala. It is currently ranked among the best universities in the United Mexican States and Latin America.

== History ==
The Autonomous University of Tlaxcala was founded on November 20, 1976. The Congress of the Free and Sovereign State of Tlaxcala, through Decree No. 95. The then President of the Republic, Luis Echeverría Álvarez attended on November 29, 1976, to lay the first stone of the university's rectory building.

== Honorable University Council ==
It is the Supreme Authority of the institution; its resolutions are binding and may only be revoked, modified or added to by the council itself. Its resolutions are recorded in the Minutes of the Council Session. It is headed by the rector of the university, who acts as president of the Honorable University Council.

== Certificates ==
- Latin American Quality Institute (Mexico Quality Certification 2014)
- Business Management Awards (International Certification 2014)
- Latin American Quality Institute (Educational Quality - Institutional Leader 2013)
- Latin American Quality Institute (Global Quality Certification 2013)
- Continental Organization of Educational Excellence (Certificate in Educational Leadership, 2013)
- Continental Organization of Educational Excellence (Certificate of Preferred Membership, 2013)
- Continental Organization for Educational Excellence (Certificate of High Quality 2012)

== Rectors ==
- Luis Carvajal Espino (1976 - 1982)
- Moisés Barceinas Paredes (1982 - 1983)
- Héctor Israel Ortiz Ortiz (1983 - 1987)
- Héctor Vázquez Galicia (1988 - 1991)
- Juan Méndez Vázquez (1992 - 1995)
- Alfredo Vázquez Galicia (1996 - 1999)
- Héctor Israel Ortiz Ortiz (1999- 2000)
- Eugenio Romero Melgarejo (2000)
- René Grada Yautentzi (2000 -2004)
- Sandino Leonel Lelis Sánchez (2004 - 2005)
- Serafín Ortiz Ortiz (2005 - 2011)
- Víctor Job Paredes Cuahquentzi (2011 – 2014)
- Rubén Reyes Córdoba (2014 - 2018)
- Luis Armando González Placencia (2018- 2022)
- Serafín Ortiz Ortiz (2022 - 2026)

== Identity ==
=== Emblem ===
The coat of arms was designed in 1977 by architect Donaciano Blanco Flores, according to the historical background of the state of Tlaxcala.

- The traditional colors of the state of Tlaxcala are red and white, which were used by Xicohténcatl in his banners.
- The Heron is the symbol of Xicohténcatl and of the state of Tlaxcala itself.
- The two arms, which emerge from the heron, represent the unity and effort of the people of Tlaxcala, which emanate from a book that represents technique and knowledge.
- Above the heron and the two arms is the state of Tlaxcala and, below them, the motto of the university "Por la Cultura, a la Justicia Social" (For Culture, for Social Justice).
- The whole emblem is crowned by the name of the Institution.

== Notable Graduates ==
- Lorena Cuéllar
- Florentino Domínguez Ordóñez
- Minerva Hernández Ramos
- Martha Palafox Gutiérrez
- Oscar Gonzalez-Flores
- Isolda Dosamantes
- María de Jesús Rovirosa-Hernández
- Eduardo Vega-Alvarado

== Memberships and Accreditations ==
- ANUIES: National Association of Universities and Institutions of Higher Education.
- CUMEX: Consortium of Mexican Universities
- ECOSAD: Espacio Común de Educación Superior a Distancia (Common Space for Distance Higher Education)
- CONACYT: National Council of Science and Technology.
- SEP: Ministry of Public Education
- CONAHEC: Consortium for North American Higher Education Collaboration:

== Educational offer ==
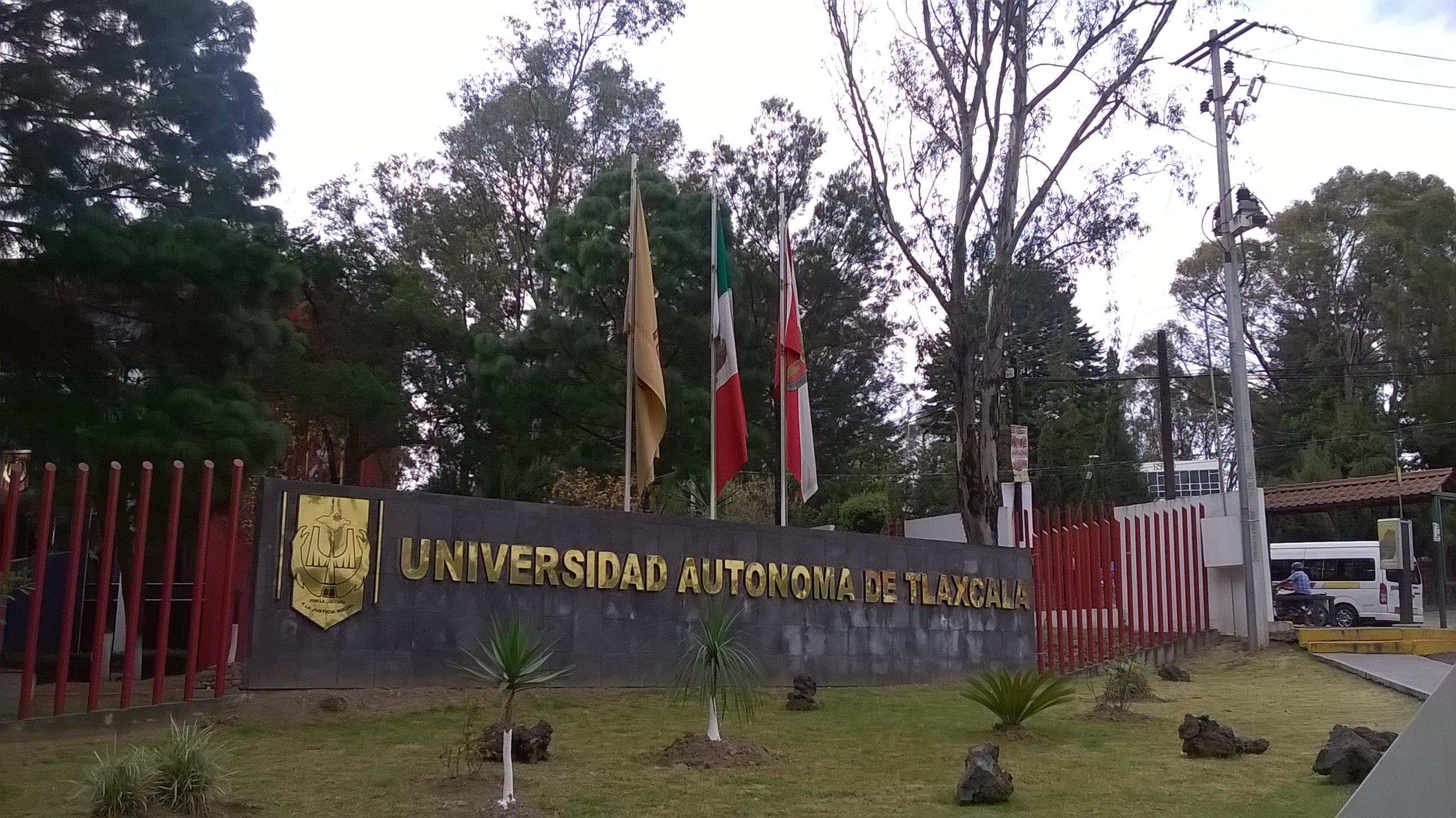
Rectoría

The Universidad Autónoma de Tlaxcala offers 42 bachelor's degrees, 2 specialties, 36 master's degrees and 11 doctorates.

== Research Centers ==
- CICB - Center for Research in Biological Sciences
- CICA - Center for Research in Administrative Sciences
- CIGyA - Center for Research in Genetics and the Environment
- CIRA - Center for Research on Animal Reproduction

CIISDER - Center for Interdisciplinary Research on Regional Development *CIJUREP - Center for Research in Environmental and Genetic Sciences

- CIJUREP - Centro de Investigaciones Jurídico-Políticas - Center for Legal-Political Research

CTBC - Tlaxcala Center for Behavioral Biology *CTBC - Tlaxcala Behavioral Biology Center

=== Bachelor's Degrees ===
Faculty of Agrobiology

- Bachelor's Degree in Biology
- Bachelor's Degree in Environmental Sciences
- Bachelor's Degree in Veterinary Medicine and Animal Husbandry
- Bachelor's Degree in Medical Naturopathy

Faculty of Basic Sciences, Engineering and Technology.

- Bachelor's Degree in Computer Engineering
- Bachelor's Degree in Electronic Systems Engineering
- Bachelor's Degree in Mechanical Engineering
- Bachelor's Degree in Chemical Engineering
- Bachelor's Degree in Applied Mathematics
- Bachelor's Degree in Applied Mathematics
- Bachelor's Degree in Industrial Chemistry

Faculty of Educational Sciences.

- Bachelor's Degree in Educational Sciences
- Bachelor's Degree in Educational Communication and Innovation

Faculty of Health Sciences

- Bachelor's degree in Nursing
- Bachelor's Degree in Nursing
- Bachelor's Degree in Nursing and Midwifery
- Bachelor's Degree in Medical Surgery
- Bachelor's Degree in Nutrition
- Bachelor's Degree in Clinical Chemistry

Faculty of Economic and Administrative Sciences

- Bachelor's Degree in Administration
- Bachelor's Degree in Administration
- Bachelor's Degree in Public Accounting
- Bachelor's Degree in International Business

Faculty of Sciences for Human Development

- Bachelor's Degree in Clinical Chemistry
- Bachelor's Degree in Integral Care of the Elderly
- Bachelor's Degree in Family Sciences
- Bachelor's Degree in Special Education

Faculty of Law, Political Science and Criminology

- Degree in Political Science and Criminology
- Bachelor's Degree in Political Science and Public Administration
- Bachelor's Degree in Criminology
- Bachelor's Degree in Law

Faculty of Design, Art and Architecture

- Bachelor of Arts in Architecture
- Bachelor's Degree in Architecture
- Bachelor's Degree in Visual Arts
- Bachelor's Degree in Automotive Design
- Bachelor's Degree in Textile Design

Faculty of Philosophy and Letters

- Bachelor of Arts in Anthropology
- Bachelor's Degree in Anthropology
- Bachelor's Degree in Language Teaching
- Bachelor's Degree in Philosophy
- B.A. in History
- Bachelor's Degree in Spanish Language and Literature
- B.A. in Applied Modern Languages
- Bachelor's Degree in Applied Modern Languages
- Bachelor's Degree in Hispanic American Literature

Faculty of Dentistry

- Bachelor's Degree in Dentistry
- Bachelor's Degree in Dental Surgery

Faculty of Social Work, Sociology and Psychology.

- Bachelor's Degree in Social Work
- Bachelor's Degree in Sociology
- Bachelor's Degree in Psychology
- Bachelor's Degree in Psychotherapy

Unidad Académica Multidisciplinaria campus Calpulalpan

- Bachelor's Degree in Management
- Bachelor's Degree in Administration
- Bachelor's Degree in Educational Sciences
- Bachelor's Degree in Political Science and Public Administration
- Bachelor's Degree in Public Accountancy
- Bachelor's Degree in Criminology
- Bachelor's Degree in Law
- Bachelor's Degree in Language Teaching
- Bachelor's Degree in Language Teaching
- Bachelor's Degree in Computer Engineering
- Bachelor's Degree in Computer Engineering
- Bachelor's Degree in Applied Modern Languages
- Bachelor's Degree in Applied Modern Languages
- Bachelor's Degree in Psychology

Multidisciplinary Academic Unit Teacalco campus

- Bachelor's Degree in Environmental Sciences
- Bachelor's Degree in Environmental Sciences
- Bachelor's Degree in Political Science and Public Administration
- Bachelor's Degree in Law
- Bachelor's Degree in Psychology
- Bachelor's Degree in Psychotherapy
- Bachelor's Degree in Social Work

=== Specialties ===
School of Dentistry

- Specialty in Endodontics
- Specialty in Pediatric Stomatology

=== Master's Degrees ===
Centro de Investigación en Ciencias Administrativas

- Master's Degree in Administration
- Master's Degree in Tax Administration
- Master's Degree in International Business

Research Center in Genetics and Environment

- Master's Degree in Environmental Sciences
- Master's Degree in Environmental Sciences
- Master's degree in Environmental Systems Science

Center for Interdisciplinary Research on Regional Development'

- Master's Degree in Regional Analysis

Center for Legal-Political Research and Graduate Studies

- Master's Degree in Public Administration
- Master's Degree in State and Municipal Public Administration
- Master's Degree in Legal Argumentation
- Master's Degree in Constitutional and Amparo Law
- Master's Degree in Constitutional Law and Constitutional Procedure
- Master's Degree in Tax Law
- Master's Degree in Tax Law
- Master's Degree in Criminal Law

Tlaxcala Center for Behavioral Biology

- Master's Degree in Biological Sciences
- Master's Degree in Biological Sciences

Faculty of Agrobiology

- Master's Degree in Animal Production
- Master's Degree in Animal Production

Faculty of Basic Sciences, Engineering and Technology

- Master's Degree in Animal Production
- Master's Degree in Quality Sciences
- Master of Science in Chemical Engineering
- Master of Science in Computational and Electronic Systems
- Master of Science in Software Engineering
- Master's Degree in Use and Management of Information and Communication Technologies.

Faculty of Education Sciences.

- Master's Degree in Teaching, Research and Educational Innovation.
- Master's Degree in Education

Faculty of Health Sciences

- Master's Degree in Health Sciences
- Master's Degree in Public Health Sciences
- Master's Degree in Nursing

Faculty of Sciences for Human Development

- Master's Degree in Special Education
- Master's Degree in Special Education
- Master's Degree in Family Therapy

School of Law, Political Science and Criminology

- Master's Degree in Constitutional Law
- Master's Degree in Constitutional and Amparo Law
- Master's Degree in Criminal Law

Facultad de Filosofía y Letras (Faculty of Philosophy and Letters)

- Master's Degree in History
- Master's Degree in Modern Languages and Discourse Studies

Faculty of Social Work, Sociology and Psychology

- Master's Degree in Social Sciences
- Master's Degree in Social Sciences
- Master's Degree in Social Work
- Master's Degree in Gender Studies

Multidisciplinary Academic Unit

- Master's Degree in Education
- Master's Degree in Education

=== Doctorate ===
Biological Sciences Research Center

- Ph.D. in Natural Sciences

Center for Interdisciplinary Research on Regional Development

- Doctorate in Territorial Studies

Center for Research in Administrative Sciences

- Doctorate in Administrative Sciences
- Doctorate in Administrative Sciences

Center for Research in Genetics and Environment

- Doctorate in Environmental Science
- Doctorate in Environmental Sciences

Center for Legal-Political Research and Graduate Studies

- Doctorate in Law and Environmental Sciences
- Doctorate in Law

Tlaxcala Center for Behavioral Biology

- Doctorate in Biological Sciences
- Doctorate in Biological Sciences

Facultad de Ciencias Básicas Ingeniería y Tecnología

- Doctorate in Basic Sciences, Engineering and Technology
- Doctorate in Chemical Engineering Sciences.
- Doctorate in Computer and Electronic Systems Sciences.

Faculty of Educational Sciences

- Doctorate in Education Sciences
- Doctorate in Education

Faculty of Sciences for Human Development

- Doctorate in Special Education
- Doctorate in Special Education
- Doctorate in Family

== Facilities ==
The university is divided by areas according to its geographical location, both in the city of Tlaxcala de Xicohténcatl and in the rest of the state of Tlaxcala. The Autonomous University of Tlaxcala is distributed throughout the following Tlaxcala municipalities:

- Tlaxcala de Xicohténcatl - Faculty of Dentistry and Faculty of Law, Political Sciences and Criminology, Faculty of Economic Administrative Sciences, Faculty of Sciences for Human Development and Faculty of Social Work, Sociology and Psychology.
- Ocotlán - Faculty of Educational Sciences and Faculty of Philosophy and Letters.
- Contla de Juan Cuamatzi - School of Design, Art and Architecture.
- Tlaxco - School of Agrobiology
- San Pablo del Monte - Unidad Académica Multidisciplinaria campus San Pablo del Monte - School of Design, Art and Architecture.
- Huamantla - Veterinary Medicine and Zootechnics
- Zacatelco - Faculty of Health Sciences
- Teacalco - Multidisciplinary Academic Unit Teacalco campus
- Apizaco - Faculty of Basic Sciences Engineering and Technology
- Ixtacuixtla - School of Agrobiology
- Calpulalpan - Unidad Académica Multidisciplinaria campus Calpulalpan - Unidad Académica Multidisciplinaria campus Calpulalpan
