= Edilberto =

Edilberto is a given name. Notable people with the name include:

- Edilberto Adan, Filipino Undersecretary in the Presidential Commission on the Visiting Forces
- Edilberto Campadese (1915–2003), Italian bobsledder
- Edilberto Domarchi (1924–2000), Chilean poet, writer and professor
- Edilberto Evangelista (1862–1897), Filipino civil engineer and a revolutionary
- Edilberto Algredo Jaramillo (born 1957), Mexican politician affiliated with the PRD
- Edilberto de Jesus, President of the Asian Institute of Management in Makati, Philippines
- Edilberto Leonardo, retired Filipino police officer and government official
- Edilberto Buenfil Montalvo (born 1938), Mexican politician from the Institutional Revolutionary Party
- Edilberto Oropesa (born 1971), Cuban former professional baseball pitcher and coach
- Edilberto Restino, Brazilian sociologist, political scientist, film director and actor
- Edilberto K. Tiempo (1913–1996), Filipino writer and professor

== See also ==
- Camp Edilberto Evangelista, military installation of the Philippine Army in Cagayan de Oro, Philippines
