= Colegio Alemán Alexander von Humboldt (disambiguation) =

Colegio Alemán Alexander von Humboldt may refer to the following German international schools in Spanish-speaking countries:

- Colegio Alemán Alexander von Humboldt (Mexico City)
- German School of Guayaquil (Spanish: Colegio Alemán Humboldt Guayaquil), Ecuador

== See also ==
- Colegio Humboldt Puebla, Mexico
- Deutsche Schule Lima Alexander von Humboldt, Peru
