= Minerva Hernández Ramos =

Mexican politician (born 1969)

Senator of the Congress of the Union for Tlaxcala
- Incumbent
- Assumed office 1 September 2018 Serving with Ana Lilia Rivera Rivera and José Antonio Álvarez Lima
- Preceded by: Amelia Torres López

Personal details
- Born: 15 September 1969 (age 55); San Damián Texoloc, Tlaxcala, Mexico
- Political party: PAN
- Education: UAT
- Occupation: Politician

Minerva Hernández Ramos (born 15 September 1969) is a Mexican politician affiliated with the National Action Party (PAN) who served in the Chamber of Deputies for the LXIII Legislature of the Mexican Congress (2015–2018). She has also served as a senator and made a bid for Governor of Tlaxcala in 2010.

== Personal life and education ==
Hernández holds bachelor's degrees in accounting and business administration, as well as a master's degree State and Municipal Public Administration, from the Autonomous University of Tlaxcala (UAT), in addition to a doctoral degree in Fiscal Sciences from the Institute for Executive Specialization. She sat on the UAT student council between 1989 and 1991 and taught there between 1995 and 2004.

== Political career ==
Hernández got her start in the Secretariat of Finances of Tlaxcala, working her way up to be the secretary. She also worked on gubernatorial and deputy campaigns in the state, and for a time in the state secretariat of health.

In 1999, Hernández joined the Party of the Democratic Revolution. In 2003, she was elected to the Chamber of Deputies as a proportional representation deputy for the LIX Legislature. She sat on the commissions for Budget and Public Accounts and Strengthening of Federalism. While in her first term as deputy, she coordinated finances in the PRD's primary election for mayor of Mexico City.

In 2006, she was elected as a senator for the LX and LXI Legislatures. She presided over the Administration and Social Security Commissions and served on eight others, including Finances and Public Credit, Foreign Relations/Asia-Pacific, and Health.

In 2010, Hernández ran for Governor of Tlaxcala as the coalition candidate for "Transparency and Honesty for Tlaxcala" (PRD-PT-Convergencia). She ultimately dropped out of the race and urged her supporters to vote for the PAN candidate, Adriana Dávila Fernández, in order to prevent the PRI from winning the elections. Months later, Hernández left the PRD to join the PAN, the second defection of a PRD senator in a short span.

In 2015, the PAN returned Hernández to the Chamber of Deputies by placing her on their list from the fifth electoral region, representing the State of Mexico. She presides over the Bicameral Commission on Financial Discipline and sits on four others, mostly financial in nature. Despite not representing her home state of Tlaxcala, in her first annual report of activities, delivered in the city of Tlaxcala, she still said that she primarily sought funds for projects in such cities as Chiautempan, Nanacamilpa and her hometown of San Damián Texoloc.

Hernández is a member of the Madrid Forum, an alliance of right-wing and far-right individuals organized by Spanish party Vox.
