= Irma Garay Loredo =

Mexican politician (born 1988)

Irma Yordana Garay Loredo (Note: In this Mexican name, the surname is Garay and the second or maternal family name is Loredo.) (born 15 March 1988) is a Mexican politician from the Labor Party (PT).

== Life and political career ==
A native of the state of Nuevo León, Irma Garay Loredo holds a bachelor's degree in administration from the Autonomous University of Nuevo León (UANL). She has served as the PT's state coordinator in both Quintana Roo (2010–2012) and Tlaxcala (2012).

She was a member of the Congress of Tlaxcala in 2018–2021 and she has been elected to the federal Chamber of Deputies on two occasions: in the 2021 mid-term election, for Tlaxcala's 2nd district; and in the 2024 general election, for Tlaxcala's 3rd district.

Her name has been mentioned as a possible candidate for the governorship of Tlaxcala in the 2027 state elections.

== Family ==
Garay Loredo is the daughter of Silvano Garay Ulloa, who has been elected twice to the Chamber of Deputies. Her brother, Silvano Garay Loredo, has also served in the Congress of Tlaxcala.

== See also ==
- LXV Legislature of the Mexican Congress
- LXVI Legislature of the Mexican Congress
