= Tenancingo =

Tenancingo may refer to:

- Tenancingo, State of Mexico, Mexico
- Tenancingo, Tlaxcala, Mexico
- Tenancingo, El Salvador
