= Federico Barbosa Gutiérrez =

Mexican politician

- Born: April 27, 1952; Xicohtzinco, Tlaxcala, Mexico
- Died: August 26, 2018 (aged 66); Totolac, Tlaxcala, Mexico
- Occupation: Politician
- Political party: PRI

Federico Barbosa Gutiérrez (27 April 1952 – 26 August 2018) was a Mexican politician affiliated with the Institutional Revolutionary Party (PRI). In 2003–2006 he served as a federal deputy in the 59th Congress, representing Tlaxcala's third district.

He previously served in the Congress of Tlaxcala as well as Attorney General of Tlaxcala.
