= Cuautlancingo =

Coordinates: 19°05′N 98°16′W

- Municipality
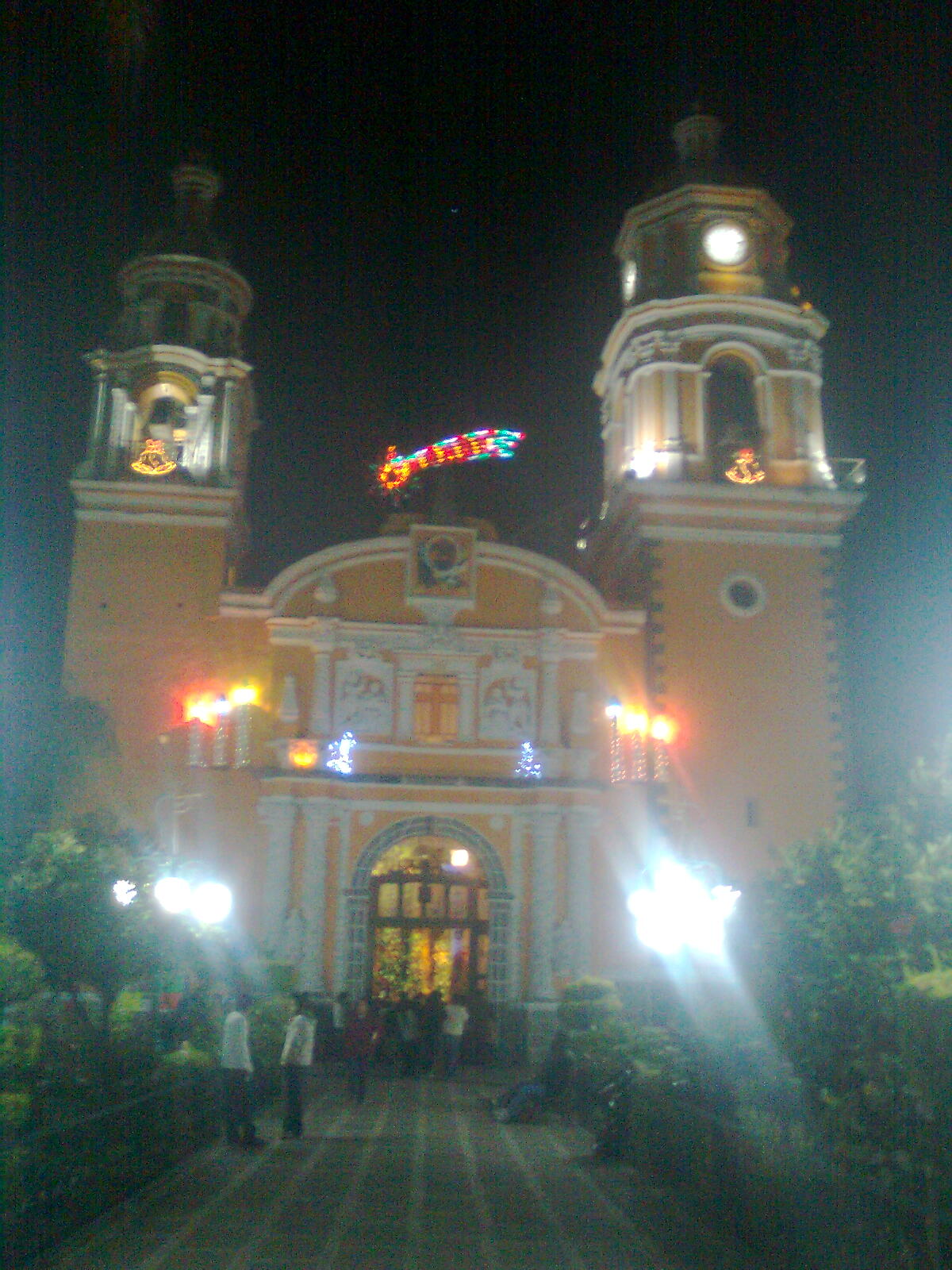

- Coat of arms

- Location of the municipality in Puebla
- Country: Mexico
- State: Puebla

Population (2020)
  - Total: 137,435
- Time zone: UTC-6 (Central)
- Website: http://www.cuautlancingo.gob.mx/

Cuautlancingo is a town and municipality in the Mexican state of Puebla. It is part of the Metropolitan area of Puebla. The town is bordered on the north by the state of Tlaxcala, on the east by Tlaxcala and the city of Puebla, on the south by the municipalities of San Pedro Cholula and Puebla, and on the west by the municipality of Coronango.

The Main Plant of Volkswagen de México, VW's biggest plant in the world outside Germany, is located in the north of Cuautlancingo. It has a capacity of 2,500 units per day and employs around 14,000 people.

The Puebla-area German school, Colegio Humboldt Puebla (Deutsche Schule Puebla), is in Cuautlancingo.
