= Silvano Garay Ulloa =

Mexican politician

- Born: 10 February 1959 (age 67); Matehuala, San Luis Potosí, Mexico
- Education: UANL
- Occupation: Politician
- Political party: PT

Silvano Garay Ulloa (Note: In this Mexican name, the surname is Garay and the second or maternal family name is Ulloa.) (born 10 February 1959) is a Mexican politician from the Labor Party (PT). From 2006 to 2009, he served as a plurinominal deputy during the 60th Congress. He was also a plurinominal deputy in the 64th Congress (2018–2021).

Garay Ulloa is the father of Irma Garay Loredo, who has been elected twice to the Chamber of Deputies for the PT. His son, Silvano Garay Loredo, has also served in the Congress of Tlaxcala.
