= San Isidro Buensuceso =

- Town
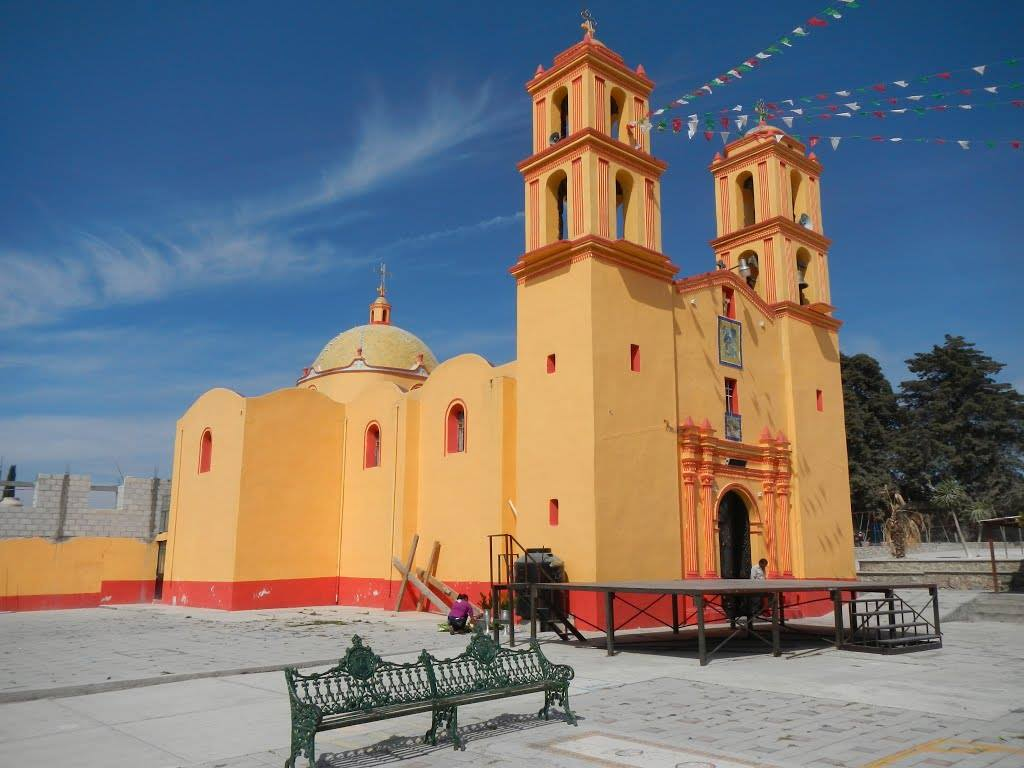
- Interactive map of San Isidro Buensuceso
- Coordinates: 19°09′10″N 98°06′25″W
- Country: Mexico
- State: Tlaxcala
- Municipality: San Pablo del Monte
- Named for: Saint Isidore the Laborer

Population
  - Total: 7,688

San Isidro Buensuceso or San Isidro Buen Suceso is a town in the municipality of San Pablo del Monte, Tlaxcala, Mexico, on the southern slope of La Malinche volcano. The town is named after Saint Isidore the Laborer (Spanish: San Isidro Labrador), whose feast day is celebrated on May 15 each year.

The people of San Isidro Buensuceso are indigenous Nahuas; the first language of children is Nahuatl. It is the most remote Nahuatl-speaking town in Tlaxcala.

== Bibliography ==
- Pablo Rogelio Navarrete Gómez (1998). Tradiciones, costumbres y cuentos de San Isidro Buensuceso, Tlaxcala. Tlaxcala: Gobierno del Estado de Tlaxcala.
- Alejandro Tonatiuh Romero Contreras (1998). Los temazcales de San Isidro Buen Suceso: cultura, medicina y tradición de un pueblo tlaxcalteca. Tlaxcala: Ediciones del Gobierno del Estado.
- Montoya, A., O. Hernández-Totomoch, A. Estrada-Torres, A. Kong & J. Caballero (2003). "Traditional knowledge about mushrooms in a Nahua community in the state of Tlaxcala, México". Mycologia. 95 (5). Mycologia, Vol. 95, No. 5: 793–806. doi:10.2307/3762007. JSTOR 3762007. PMID 21148986.
