= Perla López Loyo =

Mexican politician

- Born: 2 April 1951 (age 75); Veracruz, Mexico
- Occupation: Politician
- Political party: PRI

María Elena Perla López Loyo (born 2 April 1951) is a Mexican politician from the Institutional Revolutionary Party (PRI). From 2009 to 2012 she served as a federal deputy in the 61st Congress, representing Tlaxcala's third district.
