= Martha Palafox Gutiérrez =

Mexican politician (1949–2022)

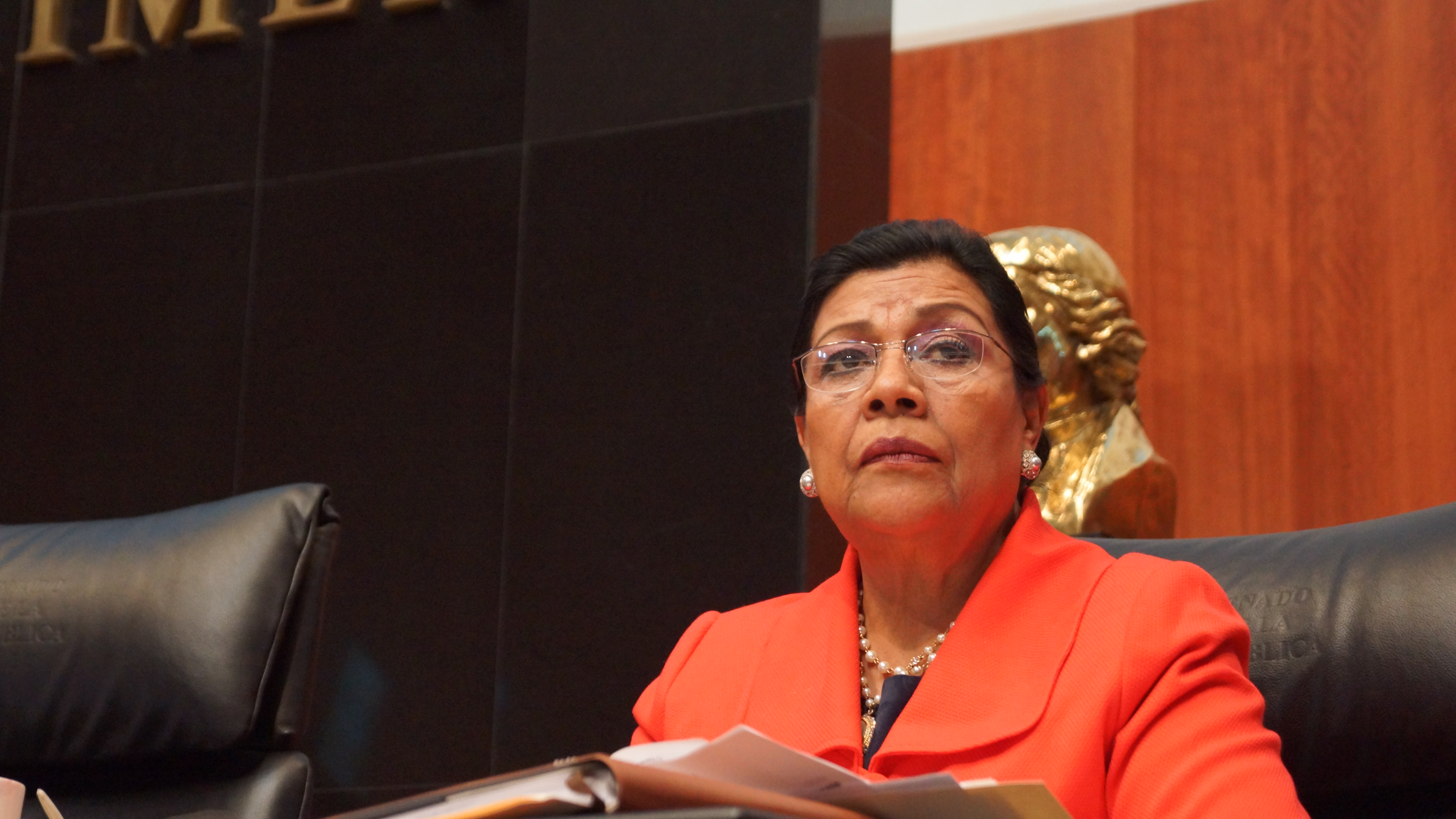
- Palafox in the Senate, 2013

Plurinominal deputy of the Congress of the Union
- In office 1 September 2003 – 31 August 2006
- Preceded by: Javier García González
- Succeeded by: José Alejandro Aguilar López

Deputy of the Congress of the Union for Tlaxcala's 3rd district
- In office 1 September 1997 – 31 August 2000
- Succeeded by: Albino Mendieta Cuapio

Personal details
- Born: 23 February 1949 Huamantla, Tlaxcala, Mexico
- Died: 17 March 2022 (aged 73)
- Party: PRI, PT, Morena.
- Occupation: Lawyer, politician

Martha Palafox Gutiérrez (23 February 1949 – 17 March 2022) was a Mexican lawyer and politician. At different times, she was affiliated with the Institutional Revolutionary Party (PRI), the Labor Party (PT) and the National Regeneration Movement (Morena).

Martha Palafox Gutiérrez was born in Huamantla, Tlaxcala, on 23 February 1949. She earned a law degree from the Autonomous University of Tlaxcala (UAT) and, in 1965, became a member of the PRI.

She was elected to the Chamber of Deputies for the 57th Congress (1997–2000), representing Tlaxcala's 3rd district for the PRI. Her second term in Congress was during the 59th Congress (2003–2006) as a plurinominal deputy for the PRI.

In the 2012 general election, she was elected to the Senate, where she served during the 62nd Congress (2012–2015), representing Tlaxcala for the PT.

She contended for the governorship of Tlaxcala for Morena in the 2016 state elections but lost to Marco Antonio Mena Rodríguez of the PRI.

Palafox Gutiérrez died on 17 March 2022.
