= Colegio Humboldt Puebla =

Coordinates: 19.064927°N 98.261935°W

- Cuautlancingo, Puebla State, Greater Puebla; Mexico

Information
- Type: German international school
- Established: 1911
- Grades: Maternal through high school

The Colegio Humboldt Puebla ("Humboldt School Puebla," German: Deutsche Schule Puebla "Puebla German School") is a German international school in Cuautlancingo, Puebla State, in Greater Puebla. It serves levels maternal through high school (preparatoria).

The school was first established with 10 primary students and a German teacher in 1911.

== See also ==
- German Mexicans
