= Alberto Amaro Corona =

Mexican politician

- Born: 8 April 1963 (age 63); Tlaxcala, Mexico
- Occupation: Politician
- Political party: Party of the Democratic Revolution

Alberto Amaro Corona (born 8 April 1963) is a Mexican politician from the Party of the Democratic Revolution (PRD). From 2006 to 2009 he served as a federal deputy in the 60th Congress, representing Tlaxcala's third district.
