= Edilberto Algredo Jaramillo =

Mexican politician

- Born: 13 February 1957 (age 69); Xicohtzinco, Tlaxcala, Mexico
- Occupation: Deputy
- Political party: PRD

Edilberto Algredo Jaramillo (born 13 February 1957) is a Mexican politician affiliated with the PRD. In 2012–2015 he served as a federal deputy in the 62nd Congress, representing Tlaxcala's third district.
