= Ana Lilia Rivera =

Mexican politician (born 1973)

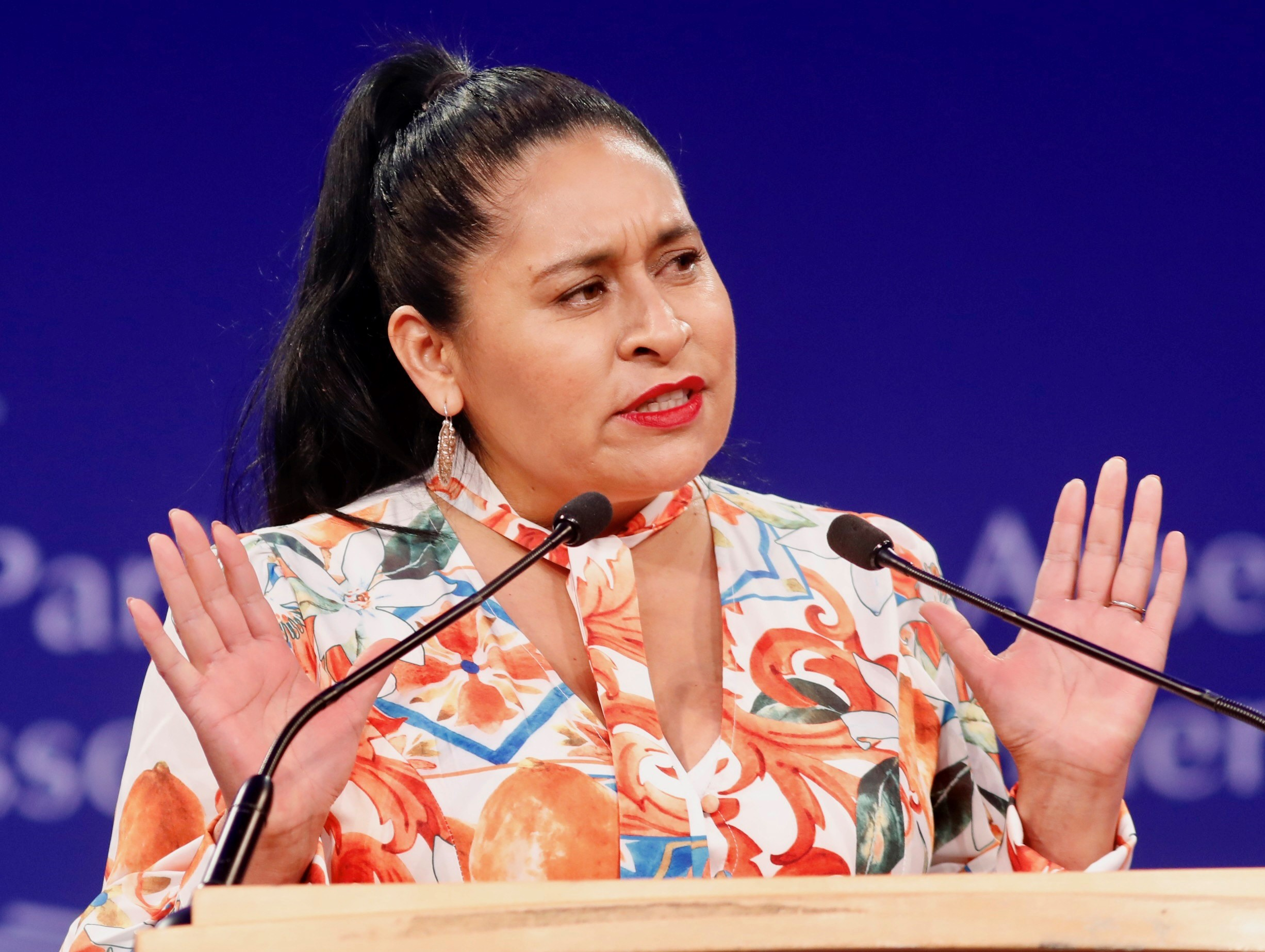
- Rivera in 2023

President of the Senate of the Republic
- In office 1 September 2023 – 31 August 2024
- Preceded by: Alejandro Armenta Mier
- Succeeded by: Gerardo Fernández Noroña

Senator of the Republic
- Incumbent
- Assumed office 1 September 2024
- Preceded by: José Antonio Álvarez Lima
- Constituency: Tlaxcala
- In office 1 September 2018 – 31 August 2024
- Preceded by: Lorena Cuéllar Cisneros
- Succeeded by: José Antonio Álvarez Lima
- Constituency: Tlaxcala

Personal details
- Born: Ana Lilia Rivera Rivera; 14 February 1973 (age 53) Calpulalpan, Tlaxcala, Mexico
- Party: MORENA
- Other political affiliations: Party of the Democratic Revolution (2000–2014)
- Education: Autonomous University of Tlaxcala
- Occupation: Politician

Ana Lilia Rivera Rivera (born 14 February 1973) is a Mexican politician who is serving as a senator from the state of Tlaxcala since 2018. A member of MORENA, she also served as the President of the Senate from 2023 to 2024.

== Career ==
Rivera was born on 14 February 1973 in the Santiago Cuaura neighborhood of Calpulalpan, Tlaxcala. She studied law at the Autonomous University of Tlaxcala; in 1994 she was a delegate to the National Democratic Convention convened by Zapatista National Liberation Army (EZLN).

She joined the Party of the Democratic Revolution (PRD) in 2000 and coordinated several political campaigns for this party. From 2008 to 2011, she represented the state's 13th district in the 59th session of the Congress of Tlaxcala; in 2014 she joined the National Regeneration Movement (Morena).

In the 2018 elections, Rivera was elected to the Senate to represent Tlaxcala for the Morena party during the 64th and 65th Congresses. She won re-election as one of Tlaxcala's senators in the 2024 Senate election, occupying the second place on the National Regeneration Movement's two-name formula.

In 2026, Morena announced her as the "state coordinator for the defense of the transformation and national sovereignty", a position expected to represent the party in the Tlaxcala gubernatorial election of 6 June 2027.
