= Bernardo de la Garza =

Mexican politician

Bernardo de la Garza Herrera (born October 14, 1970 in Mexico City) is a Mexican politician and former candidate for the Partido Verde Ecologista de México (PVEM, "Ecologist Green Party of Mexico") in the 2006 presidential election. He is married to Ana María de la Garza and has one son and one daughter.

He graduated from the Monterrey Institute of Technology and Higher Studies with a bachelor's degree in accountancy, received a master's degree in management from the University of California at Los Angeles and specialized in finance at the Autonomous Technology Institute of Mexico (ITAM).

De la Garza served in the Chamber of Deputies during the LVIII Legislature (2000 – 2003), In 2003 he was elected to the Legislative Assembly of the Federal District via the proportional representation. On November 12, 2005, the PVEM formally elected him as its candidate to the 2006 presidential election, though he resigned on December 5 when the PVEM allied with the PRI. The candidate for both parties was Roberto Madrazo.

In 2009 De la Garza was designated by Alonso Lujambio as the head of the CONADE (Spanish acronym for Comisión Nacional del Deporte y Cultura Física).
