= Zacatelco =

Zacatelco, Tlaxcala
- City
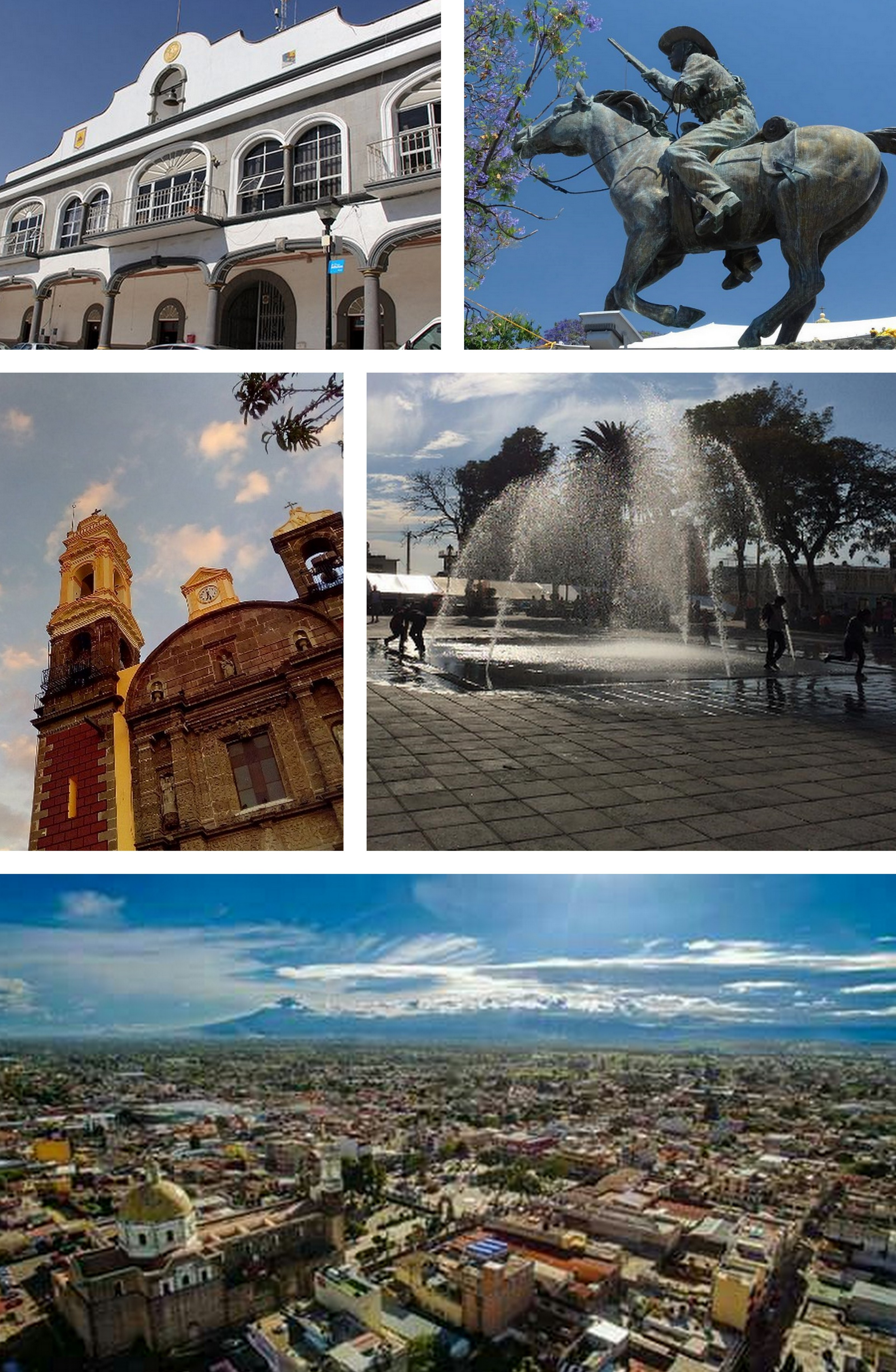
- From top left to bottom right: City hall, Domingo Arenas monument, St. Agnes Parish, Main square, Overview of Zacatelco.

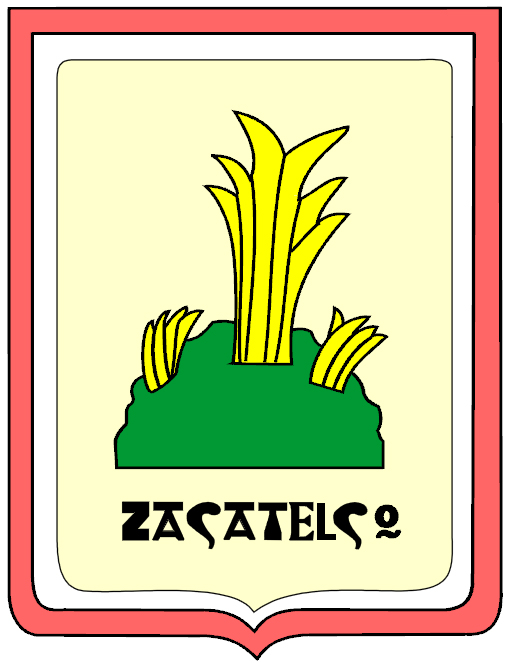
- Coat of arms
- Nickname: Spanish: Corazón del sur (English: South Heart)
- Location in Mexico Zacatelco, Tlaxcala (Mexico)
- Coordinates: 19°13′00″N 98°14′00″W
- Country: Mexico
- State: Tlaxcala
- Municipality: Zacatelco
- Foundation: 1 December 1529; 496 years ago
- Founder: Agustín de Castañeda

Government
  - Mayor: Hildeberto Pérez Álvarez

Area
  - City: 31.38 km^{2} (12.12 sq mi)
- Elevation: 2,210 m (7,250 ft)

Population (2010)
  - City: 38,466
  - Estimate (2015): 42,150
  - Metro: 3,010,560
  - Demonym: Zacatelquense
- Time zone: UTC-6 (Central)
- Area code: 246
- HDI (2020): ▲0.928 very high
- Metropolitan area: Metropolitan area of Puebla
- Website: www.zacatelco.gob.mx

Zacatelco (Spanish pronunciation: [sakaˈtelko]) is a city and municipal seat of the Zacatelco municipality located in the south of the Mexican state of Tlaxcala. According to a 2010 population census conducted by the National Institute of Statistics and Geography, the city has a population of 38,466 people; it is the sixth most populous city in the state and is part of the Metropolitan area of Puebla. The city is also head of the third electoral district of Tlaxcala.

The city was founded on December 1, 1529 by Agustín de Castañeda. The Zacateco Republic was founded in 1723; this was achieved by joining the towns of San Juan, San Lorenzo, Santo Toribio, Santa Catarina, San Marcos and San Antonio, which was depended on Tepeyanco.

The most important historical figures of the city were the Arenas brothers, which were prominent revolutionaries. Domingo Arenas took the first land committee of Mexico in 1915 and was one reason for coining the phrase: "Zacatelco; the heart of the south."

Zacatelco is located in the southern part of the valley of Tlaxcala, on the border with the state of Puebla. The city is at an altitude of 2,210 meters above sea level, making it one of the highest cities in Mexico. It is located 11.9 km from the state capital, 27.1 km from the city of Puebla, and 121.8 km from Mexico City.

== History ==
=== Prehispanic Period ===
The first human settlements discovered in Zacatelco correspond to a cultural Tlatempa phase, between 1200 BCE and 800 BCE. These settlements were scattered villages and towns, likely the same Zacatelco where high architectural structures are observed within the present municipality of Tepeyanco.

Between 800 and 350 BCE, the Texoloc phase developed according to the mapping done by the Puebla-Tlaxcala Archaeological Project (PAPT) in the town of Zacatelco. A large town or city is located adjacent to Cholula.

In the Tezoquipan phase, the area now occupied by the town of Zacatelco, a town bordering Cholula, can be located. In addition, there is known contact with two villages and peoples other than the municipalities of Tepeyanco and Tetlatlahuca. Although there is no evidence of the existence of these sites in what is now Zacatelco, it is known that during this phase the city was under the influence of Cholula.

Despite this, most historians refer only to the four domains that formed the Republic of Tlaxcala and the arrival of the Spaniards and their chiefs as the lords of Tlaxcala. According to this division, Zacatelco belonged to the lordship of Ocotelulco until the arrival of Hispanics on Tlaxcalteca land.

=== Modern Age ===
On January 18, General Oscar Aguilar returned to the state capital from Zacatelco, where he disarmed a group attempting to prevent Ignacio Mendoza from assuming the governorship. Aguilar seized 56 firearms from local political factions; however, several members involved were from the state of Puebla. To maintain order, a federal garrison of 40 men was established in Zacatelco to prevent further unrest.

On August 29, 1945, the Organic Law of Municipalities for the state of Tlaxcala was enacted. It established the free municipality as the basis of territorial division, and recognized 42 municipalities including Zacatelco. The city saw progress in education and culture. In March 1955, the high school, "Secondary Teaching Number 19 Mariano Matamoros," was established. That year, Amado Morales Cordero published Tlaxcalteca Geonimia, a reference work on the Nahuatl language.

On May 5, 1967, the Zacatelco municipal park opened, followed by the opening of the municipal market in 1970. On July 2, 1971, Augusto Gomez Villanueva visited the region to meet with various farmers' committees, including a delegation from Zacatelco, to discuss land distribution and suburban development. On March 10, 1972, the School of Sciences and Humanities (CCH) was established in the Capula district at the "Domingo Arenas" primary school and became affiliated with UNAM under the direction of Ing. Jorge Antonio Acevedo. On June 1, 1980, President José López Portillo inaugurated the Zacatelco resort.

== Geography ==
=== Location ===
Located in the Mexican plateau, the town of Zacatelco is located at the geographic coordinates between 19 degrees and 13 minutes north and 98 degrees and 14 minutes west. The town is 2,210 meters above sea level.

Located south of the state in the Poblano-Tlaxcala Valley, the town of Zacatelco is bordered on the north by the municipalities of San Lorenzo Axocomanitla and Tepeyanco and on the south by the state of Puebla. The town borders the municipalities of Santa Catarina Ayometla, Santa Cruz Xicohtzinco and Quilehtla to the east and the municipalities of Tetlatlahuca and Natívitas to the west, together forming one of the municipalities of the Metropolitan area of Puebla.

== Symbols of the municipality ==
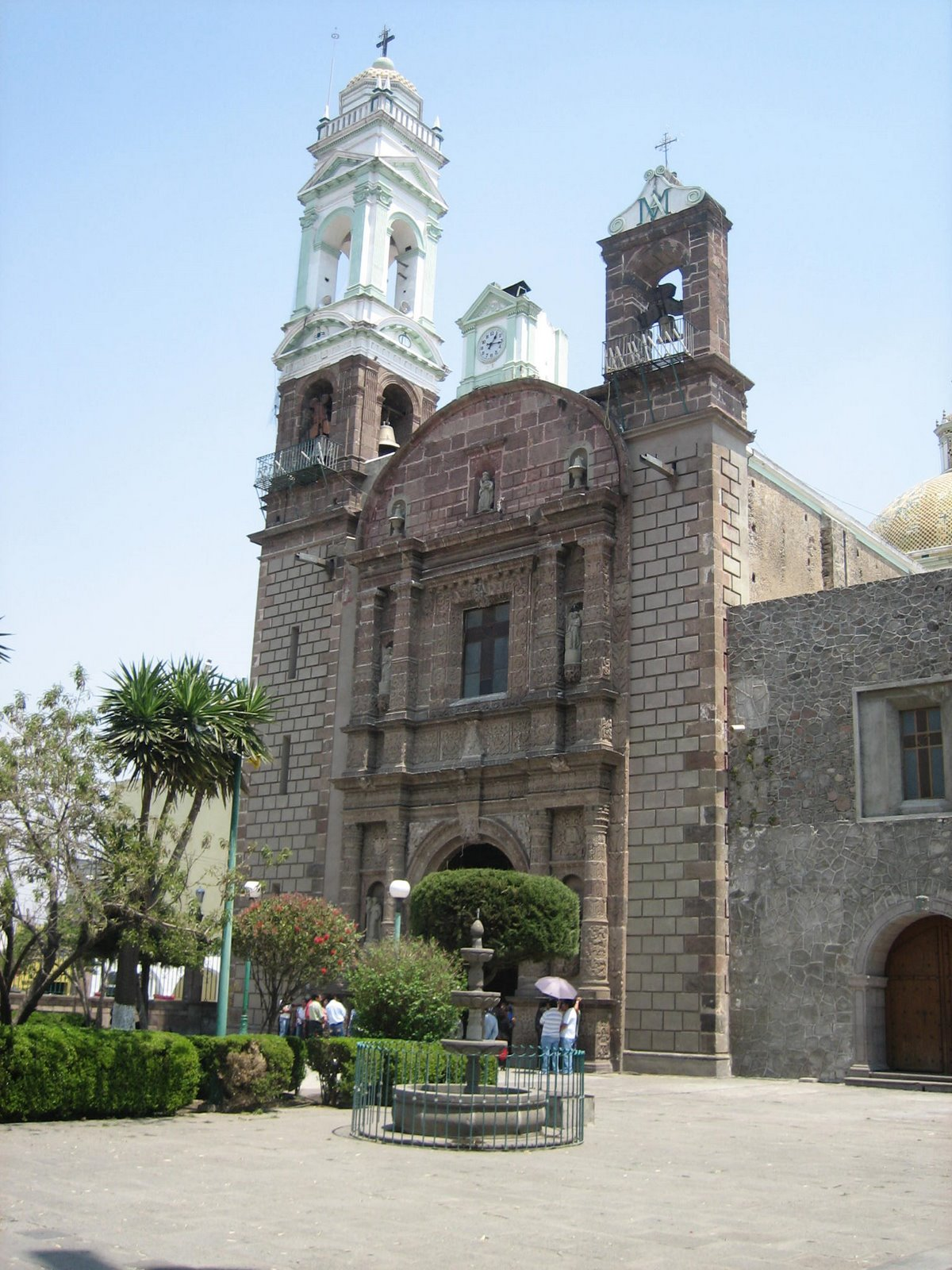
Parish of St. Agnes

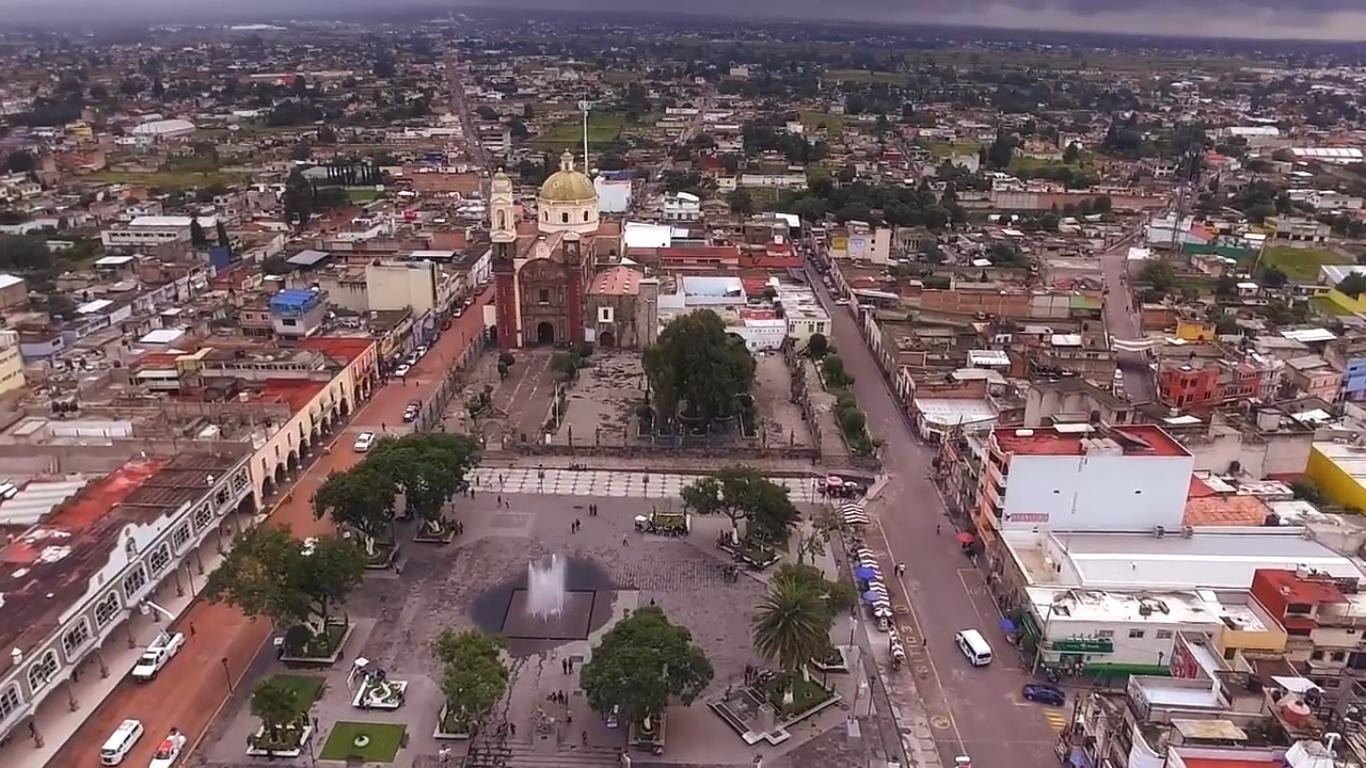
Historic center of Zacatelco

Zacatelco Township is located in the tourist route "Cacaxtla Xochitécatl"; this route brings the southwest archaeological site of Cacaxtla-Xochitécatl, often deemed one of the most interesting cities on the route. The municipality is located 12 km south of the city of Tlaxcala and 10 km from the state capital. The La Parroquia de Santa Inés, one of the city's main tourist attrations, contains a monumental altarpiece made entirely of wood. Another commonly visited tourist attraction is the Resort Zacatelco.

=== Monument Domingo Arenas ===
In Central Park Zacatelco, the monument of revolutionary leader Domingo Arenas stands proudly on his horse, often referred to as "the horse" by locals. Domingo Arenas was born in Tlaxcala on August 4, 1888, and was the son of Francisco Arenas and Margarita Perez, both of peasant origin. He worked as a herdsman, bread delivery man, and a worker in various factories. When exploding the fight against Porfirio Díaz entered the maderistas under the command of General Felipe Villegas forces. His brother, Cirilo Pérez Arenas was the most important maderista of Tlaxcala, after proclaimed the Plan de Ayala adhered quickly and had major struggles of weapons both in Tlaxcala and Puebla.

=== Parish of Santa Ines ===
This building was built in the second half of the eighteenth century, replacing the original of the sixteenth century. Its cover, Baroque, contains decorative elements such as polygonal pilasters with framing acanthus leaves, alluding to the Roman martyr images. Located inside is one of the most remarkable architectural structures of Tlaxcala, achieved with fluted pilasters, Ionic capitals, and beautiful roofs. The dome in the presbytery, reminiscent of Puebla Cathedral, is a large altarpiece where stipes and twisted columns are combined.

This altarpiece is distinguished by its streets, concave and convex, among which highlight the canvases shown archangels and figures of the cusp, the representation of San Miguel "captain of the heavenly host", and other carvings from the seventeenth century. The parish also keeps a stoup, one-piece, which was carved from basalt in the early seventeenth century heraldic motifs whose sides were recorded with the wounds of Christ, a symbol of the Franciscans.

== Hydrography ==
The water resources of the municipality include permanent stream flow, four streams that flow only during the rainy season, a small dam for water extraction wells, and a springs resort. Ameyal of Ametoxtla, municipality waters of Zahuapan and Atoyac rivers.

== Climate ==
The municipality has a temperate humid climate, with rainfall in the months of June to September and the hottest months are March to June. The average annual temperature ranges from 7.3 °C to 25.3 °C. The municipality receives an average of 871.3 mm of precipitation per year. The wind direction is generally north to south.

Climate data for Zacatelco (1951–2010)
Month	Jan	Feb	Mar	Apr	May	Jun	Jul	Aug	Sep	Oct	Nov	Dec	Year
Record high °C (°F)	28.0 (82.4)	31.5 (88.7)	32.0 (89.6)	35.5 (95.9)	36.0 (96.8)	35.0 (95.0)	32.0 (89.6)	30.0 (86.0)	31.0 (87.8)	32.0 (89.6)	34.0 (93.2)	29.5 (85.1)	36.0 (96.8)
Mean daily maximum °C (°F)	22.6 (72.7)	24.5 (76.1)	26.4 (79.5)	28.2 (82.8)	28.2 (82.8)	26.1 (79.0)	25.4 (77.7)	25.3 (77.5)	25.0 (77.0)	24.7 (76.5)	24.5 (76.1)	22.6 (72.7)	25.3 (77.5)
Daily mean °C (°F)	13.1 (55.6)	14.6 (58.3)	16.3 (61.3)	17.9 (64.2)	18.4 (65.1)	17.9 (64.2)	17.2 (63.0)	17.2 (63.0)	17.3 (63.1)	16.4 (61.5)	15.4 (59.7)	13.6 (56.5)	16.3 (61.3)
Mean daily minimum °C (°F)	3.6 (38.5)	4.8 (40.6)	6.2 (43.2)	7.7 (45.9)	8.7 (47.7)	9.7 (49.5)	9.0 (48.2)	9.0 (48.2)	9.4 (48.9)	8.1 (46.6)	6.3 (43.3)	4.5 (40.1)	7.3 (45.1)
Record low °C (°F)	−3.5 (25.7)	0.0 (32.0)	0.0 (32.0)	0.0 (32.0)	0.0 (32.0)	0.1 (32.2)	0.0 (32.0)	2.8 (37.0)	4.0 (39.2)	0.0 (32.0)	−1.0 (30.2)	−2.0 (28.4)	−3.5 (25.7)
Average precipitation mm (inches)	8.3 (0.33)	8.0 (0.31)	9.9 (0.39)	31.6 (1.24)	72.8 (2.87)	163.0 (6.42)	161.5 (6.36)	174.2 (6.86)	155.2 (6.11)	65.1 (2.56)	14.6 (0.57)	7.1 (0.28)	871.3 (34.30)
Average precipitation days (≥ 0.1 mm)	1.3	0.9	1.6	4.9	9.6	15.9	15.6	16.6	15.6	7.8	1.6	0.8	92.2
Source: Servicio Meteorologico Nacional

== Culture ==
=== Annual Fair ===
Zacatelco Fair combines faith, tradition and culture in honor of the virgin Santa Ines, the patron of Zacatelco since December 1, 1529. The fair is celebrated on January 21 annually. This community festival is celebrated with artistic, cultural, sporting, and religious order activities.

Most inhabitants of the city usually entertain guests on the day of the fair with a special food to celebrate the occasion, usually consisting of rice, mole poblano, and sometimes barbecue.

When visiting during the Zacatelco Fair, guests will also be invited to partake in meals and activities. Guests are encouraged to bring presents to their hosts, such as fruits or bread.

=== The Dance of the Chivarrudos ===
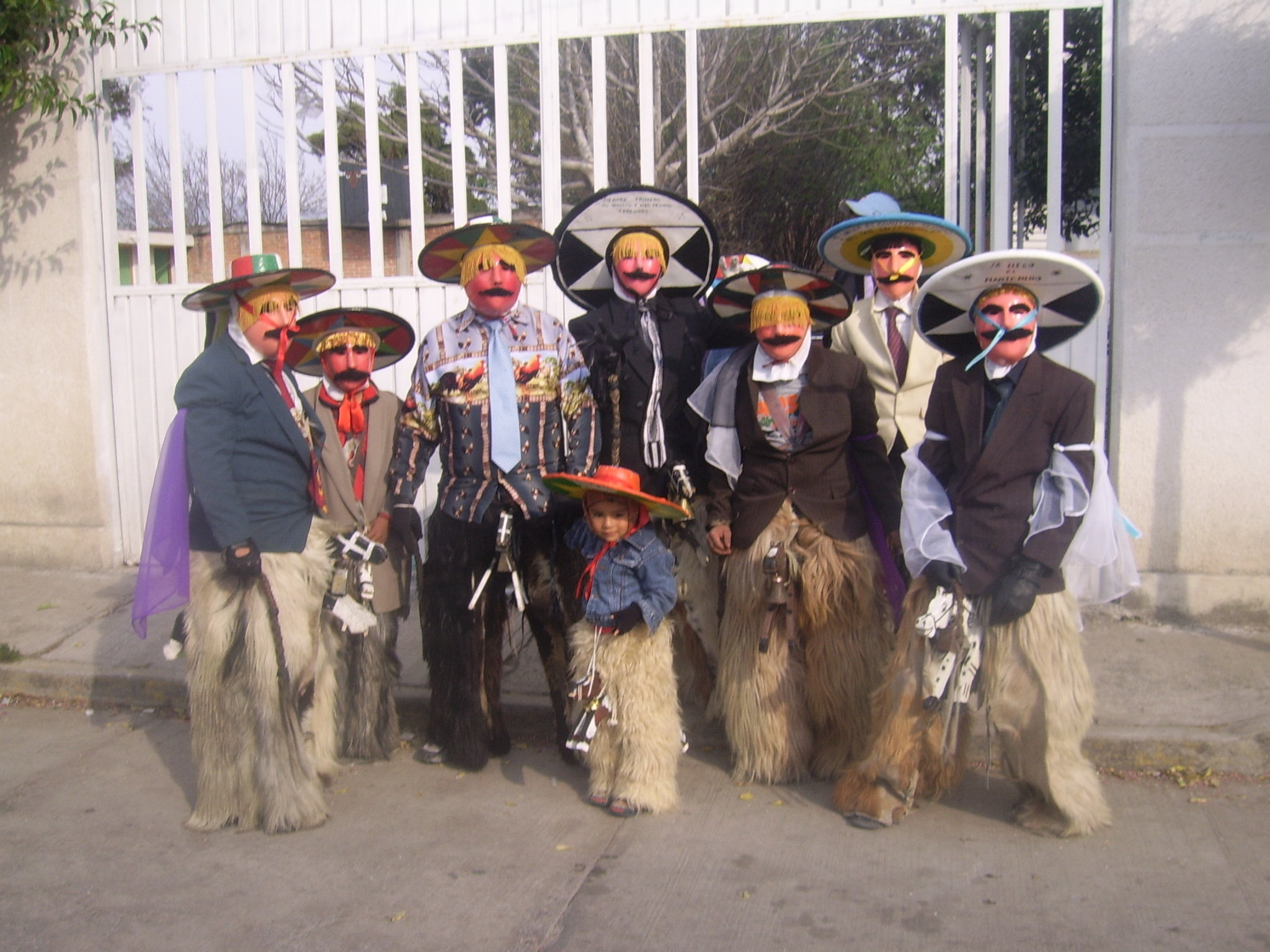
Chivarrudos

The dance of the Chivarrudos recreates the cowboys, goatherds, wranglers, laborers, foremen of cattle ranches, and farm animal caregivers in Tlaxcala during the late nineteenth and early twentieth centuries. The tradition of this dance spans several municipalities in the south of the state, such as Zacatelco, Xicohtzinco and Quiletla, where it has been practiced for over a century. The name "Chivarrudos" comes from the tanned hide obtained from the skins of goats, which is used as chaps to dance and gives off a strong scent that few can tolerate.

Dancers are often dressed in dark pants with the traditional chaps or "chivarras", a white shirt, a black jacket, a red bandana knotted around the neck, black boots, wide-brim hats in different colors, and mount a small, wooden horse. Dancers also wear an unmistakable, coloreteada cow mask with bulging eyebrows and a mustache; these masks do not have eyes and instead have two small holes to see from.

Dancers are accompanied by the rhythmic sound of teponaxtle (huehuetl, pre-Hispanic drum), which is hammered by a performer with a couple of rolls, often resembling the sound of a horse trotting.

== Cacao Drink ==
One of the traditional drinks that distinguishes the municipality as well as the state of Tlaxcala is Cacahuatole, a cacao drink known among locals as "Water Canyon". It was named an Intangible Cultural Heritage by the State Congress. When sold in other municipalities, the merchants of the "Water Canyon" have aprons with the legend of Cocoa Zacatelco.

The drink is prepared in red gourd bowls decorated with figures, and is today often served in plastic bags or cups with straws.

A local legend says: "Cocoa can only be beaten by one person and if someone else also beats it, the drink loses its consistency." Another local legend says: "The person who prepares it should not be angry, because it will not generate foam and will taste bitter."

== Sister cities ==
- Camagüey, Cuba (2010)
