= Loredo =

Loredo is a surname. Notable people with the surname include:

- Álvaro Elías Loredo (born 1947), Mexican politician
- Carlos Loredo (1951–1998), Cuban footballer
- John Loredo (born 1967), American politician
- Linda Loredo (1907–1931), actress and dancer
- Rafael Loredo (born 1957), Mexican football coach and former player

== See also ==
- Laredo (disambiguation)
- Loreto (disambiguation)
