= San Lorenzo Axocomanitla =

- Municipality
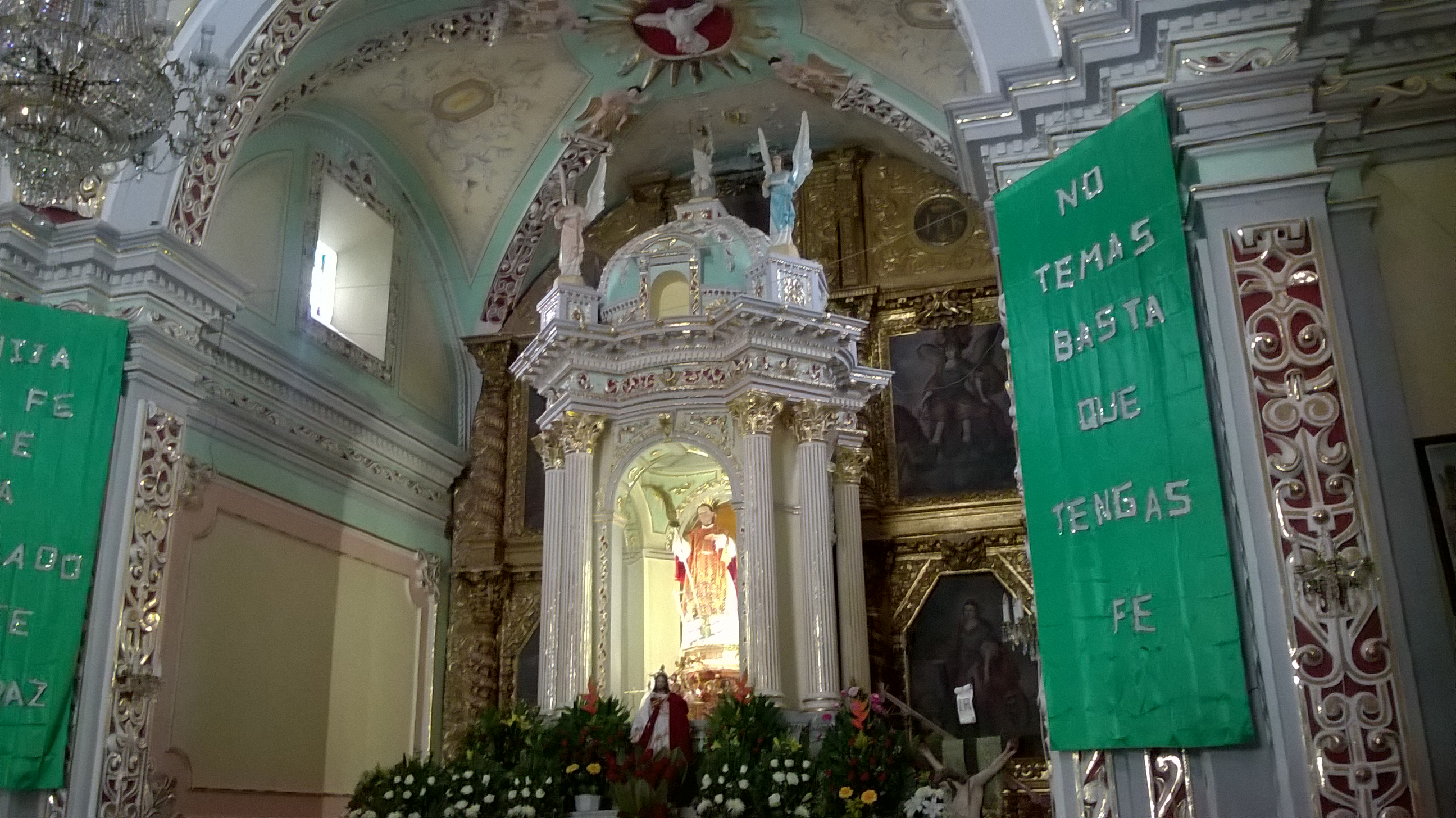

- Location within Tlaxcala Location within Mexico
- Coordinates: 19.2333°N 98.25°W
- Country: Mexico
- State: Tlaxcala
- Capital: San Lorenzo Axocomanitla

Government
  - Mayor: Oracio Tuxpan Sánchez

Area
  - Total: 4,540 km^{2} (1,750 sq mi)

Population (2005)
  - Total: 5,045
  - Density: 1.11/km^{2} (2.88/sq mi)
- Time zone: UTC-6 (Central)

San Lorenzo Axocomanitla is a town and its surrounding municipality in the Mexican state of Tlaxcala. The municipality covers an area of 4,540 km^{2}. The municipality has a total population of 5,045.
