= Mazatecochco de José María Morelos =

- Municipality
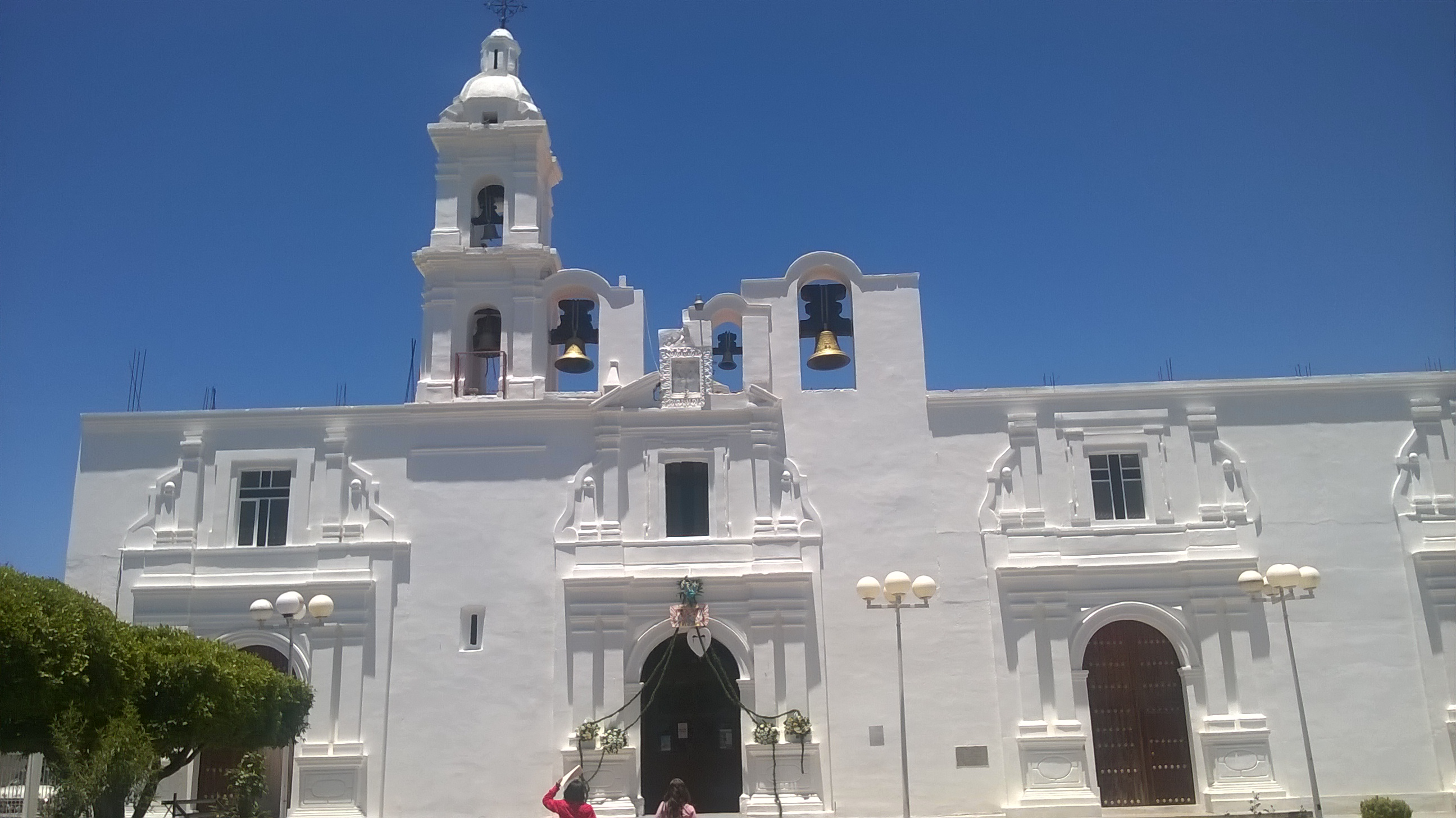

- Location within Tlaxcala Location within Mexico
- Coordinates: 19.1833°N 98.1833°W
- Country: Mexico
- State: Tlaxcala
- Time zone: UTC-6 (Central)

Mazatecochco de José María Morelos is a town and its surrounding municipality in the Mexican state of Tlaxcala.
