= San Pablo del Monte, Tlaxcala =

San Pablo del Monte
- City
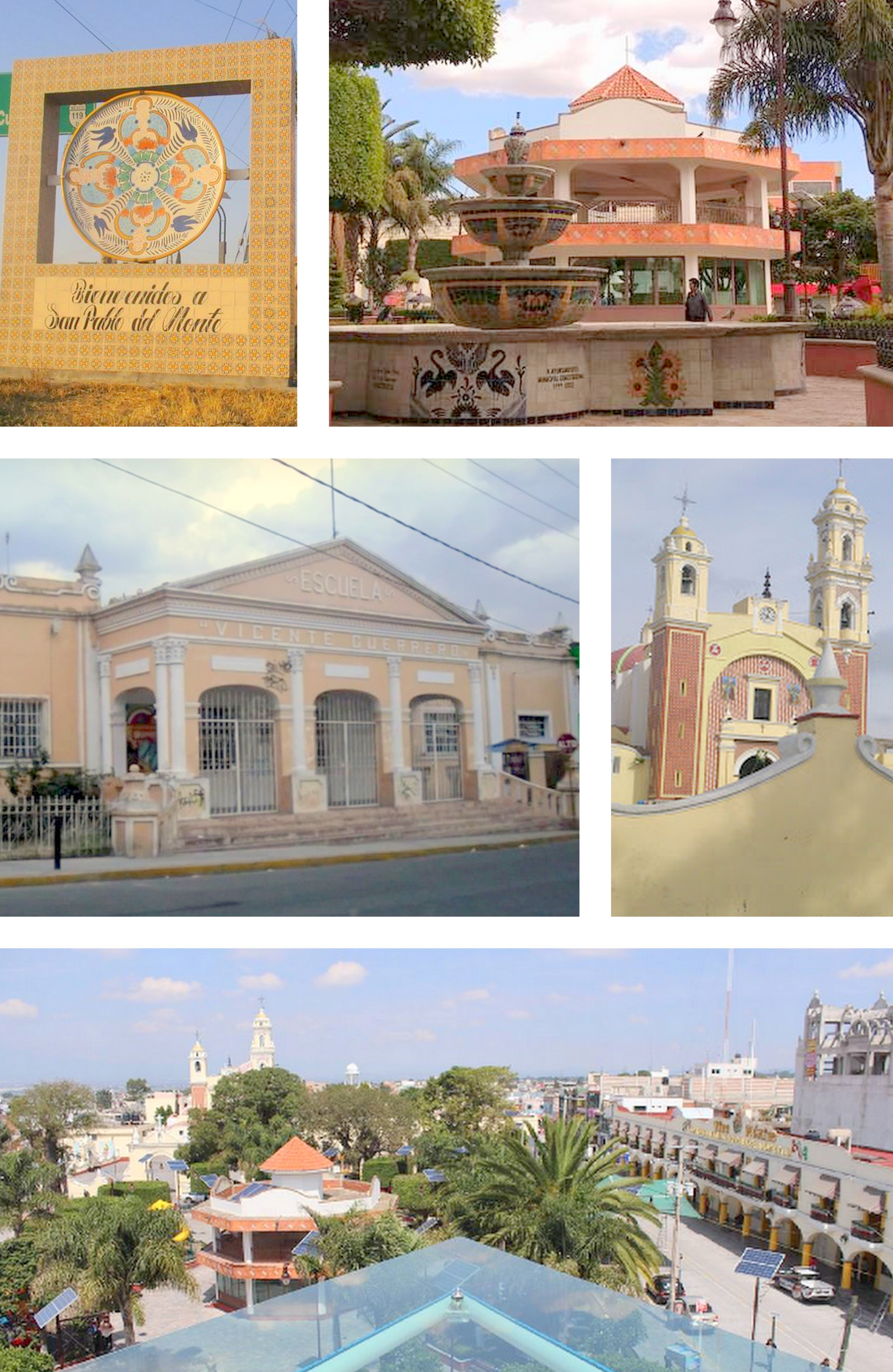

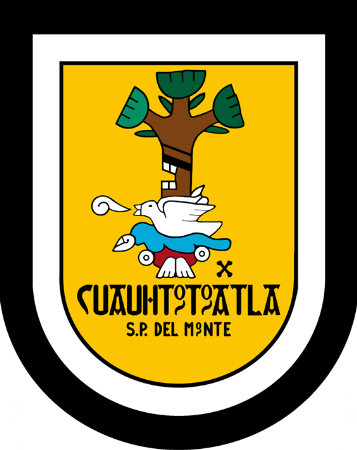
- Seal

- Location in Mexico
- Coordinates: 19.119°N 98.170°W
- Country: Mexico
- State: Tlaxcala
- Municipality: San Pablo del Monte
- Established: 1620

Area
  - Total: 12.66 km^{2} (4.89 sq mi)
- Elevation: 2,300 m (7,500 ft)

Population (2020)
  - Total: 82,688
- Time zone: UTC-6 (Central Standard Time)
- Postal code: 90900

San Pablo del Monte (formerly Villa Vicente Guerrero) is a city in the municipality of the same name and the largest city in the south of the Mexican state of Tlaxcala, It is located at the southernmost point in the state, near the border with the adjoining state of Puebla. It is a suburb of the city of Puebla and a component of its metropolitan area. At the 2005 census the population of the city was 55,760.

For many years the town was named after the revolutionary general Vicente Guerrero. The name was changed to the same name of the surrounding municipality effective December 20, 2016, by way of a decree published in the official gazette of the state government.
