= Teolocholco =

- Municipality
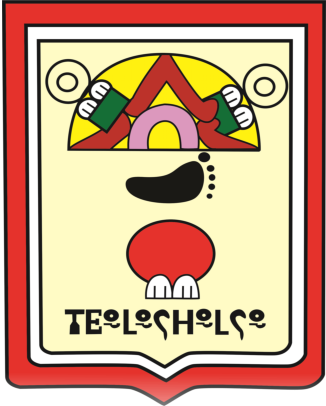
- Coat of arms

- Location within Tlaxcala Location within Mexico
- Coordinates: 19°15′N 98°11′W
- Country: Mexico
- State: Tlaxcala
- Time zone: UTC-6 (Central)

Teolocholco is a town and its surrounding municipality in the Mexican state of Tlaxcala.

== Geography ==
=== Climate ===
Climate data for Teolocholco (1951–2010)
Month	Jan	Feb	Mar	Apr	May	Jun	Jul	Aug	Sep	Oct	Nov	Dec	Year
Record high °C (°F)	40.0 (104.0)	35.0 (95.0)	32.0 (89.6)	33.0 (91.4)	33.0 (91.4)	35.0 (95.0)	30.0 (86.0)	34.5 (94.1)	30.0 (86.0)	31.0 (87.8)	40.0 (104.0)	40.0 (104.0)	40.0 (104.0)
Mean daily maximum °C (°F)	22.8 (73.0)	24.2 (75.6)	25.6 (78.1)	27.1 (80.8)	27.4 (81.3)	24.8 (76.6)	23.9 (75.0)	24.3 (75.7)	23.6 (74.5)	23.8 (74.8)	24.4 (75.9)	23.7 (74.7)	24.6 (76.3)
Daily mean °C (°F)	13.1 (55.6)	14.3 (57.7)	15.6 (60.1)	17.1 (62.8)	18.1 (64.6)	17.4 (63.3)	16.7 (62.1)	16.8 (62.2)	16.5 (61.7)	15.7 (60.3)	14.9 (58.8)	13.8 (56.8)	15.8 (60.4)
Mean daily minimum °C (°F)	3.4 (38.1)	4.5 (40.1)	5.8 (42.4)	7.5 (45.5)	9.2 (48.6)	10.2 (50.4)	9.7 (49.5)	9.4 (48.9)	9.5 (49.1)	7.7 (45.9)	5.6 (42.1)	3.7 (38.7)	7.2 (45.0)
Record low °C (°F)	−8.5 (16.7)	−3.9 (25.0)	−2.0 (28.4)	1.0 (33.8)	3.0 (37.4)	0.1 (32.2)	3.0 (37.4)	−9.0 (15.8)	1.3 (34.3)	−1.0 (30.2)	−3.0 (26.6)	−3.0 (26.6)	−9.0 (15.8)
Average precipitation mm (inches)	11.0 (0.43)	4.1 (0.16)	9.4 (0.37)	30.5 (1.20)	74.0 (2.91)	142.0 (5.59)	171.6 (6.76)	171.8 (6.76)	166.8 (6.57)	70.5 (2.78)	12.9 (0.51)	5.4 (0.21)	870.0 (34.25)
Average precipitation days (≥ 0.1 mm)	1.3	0.8	1.8	5.0	10.3	15.4	16.5	16.6	15.1	7.6	1.7	0.8	92.9
Source: Servicio Meteorologico Nacional
