= Papalotla de Xicohténcatl =

- Municipality
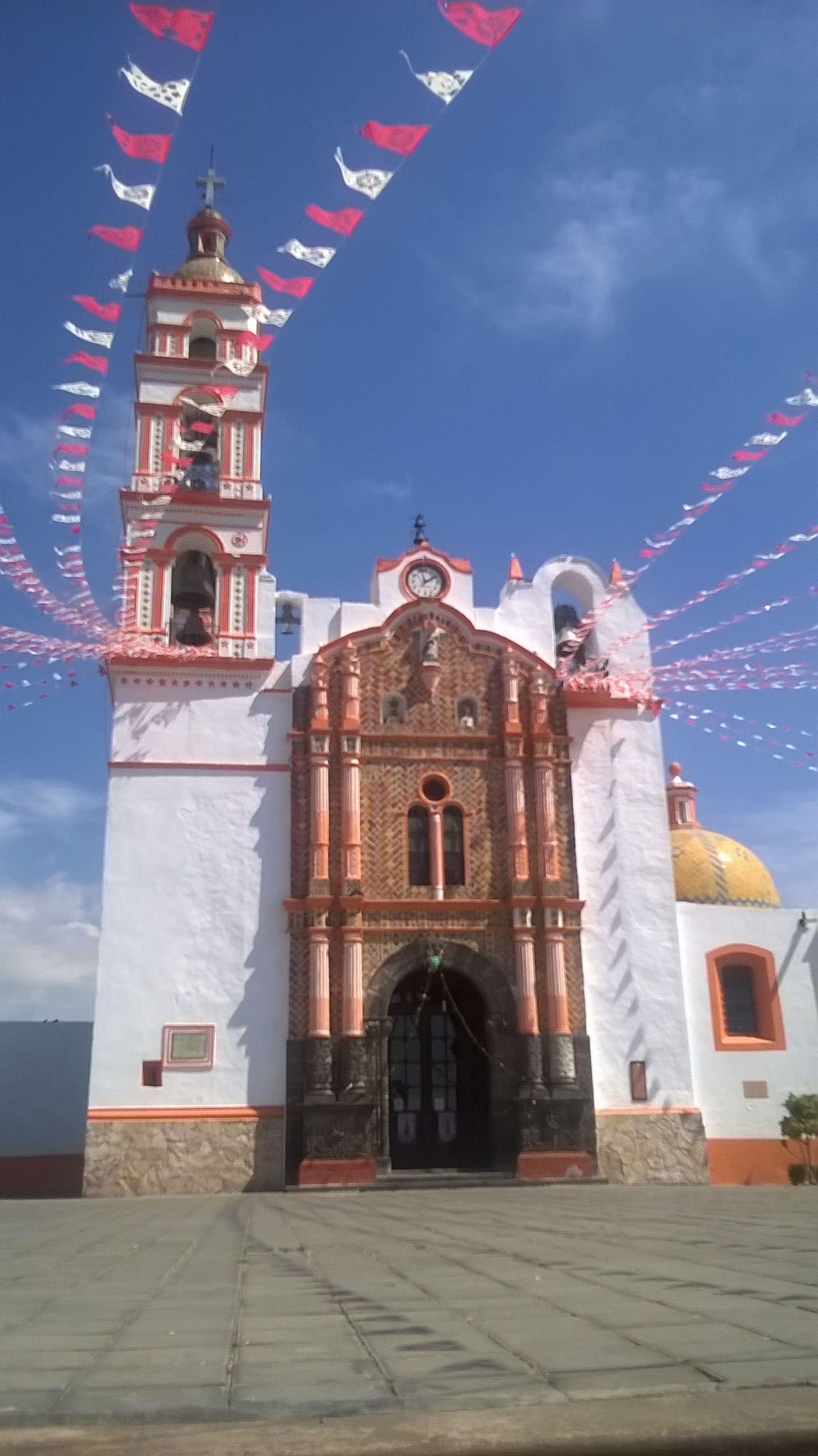
- Parish of St. Francis of Assisi

- Location within Tlaxcala Location within Mexico
- Country: Mexico
- State: Tlaxcala
- Time zone: UTC-6 (Central)

Papalotla de Xicohténcatl is a town and its surrounding municipality in the Mexican state of Tlaxcala.
