= San Pablo del Monte =

- Municipality
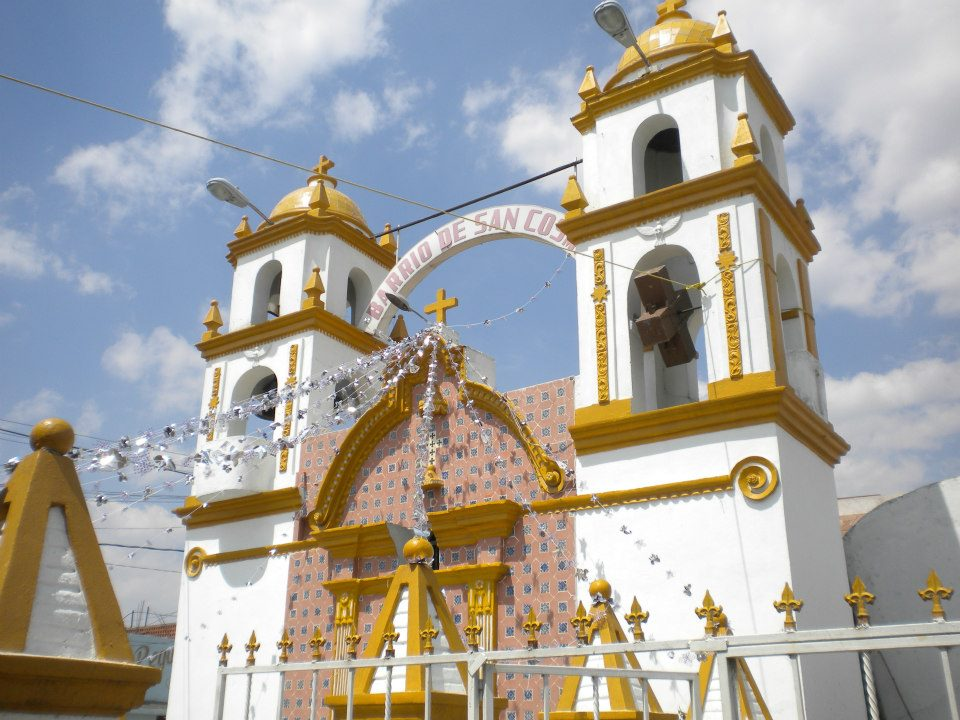
- Chapel of Saint Cosmas

- Location within Tlaxcala Location within Mexico
- Coordinates: 19°07′N 98°10′W
- Country: Mexico
- State: Tlaxcala

Population (2020)
  - Total: 70,224
- Time zone: UTC−6 (Central)

San Pablo del Monte is a municipality in the extreme south of the Mexican state of Tlaxcala. Its seat is at San Pablo del Monte (formerly Vicente Guerrero).

== See also ==
- San Isidro Buensuceso
