= Santa Catarina Ayometla =

- Municipality
- Location within Tlaxcala Location within Mexico
- Country: Mexico
- State: Tlaxcala

Population (2020)
  - Total: 9,463
- Time zone: UTC-6 (Central)

Santa Catarina Ayometla is a town and its surrounding municipality in the Mexican state of Tlaxcala.
