= San Juan Huactzinco =

- Municipality
- Location within Tlaxcala Location within Mexico
- Coordinates: 19.2333°N 98.25°W
- Country: Mexico
- State: Tlaxcala
- Time zone: UTC-6 (Central)

San Juan Huactzinco is a town and its surrounding municipality in the Mexican state of Tlaxcala.
