= Acuamanala de Miguel Hidalgo =

Coordinates: 19.2167°N 98.2°W

- Municipality
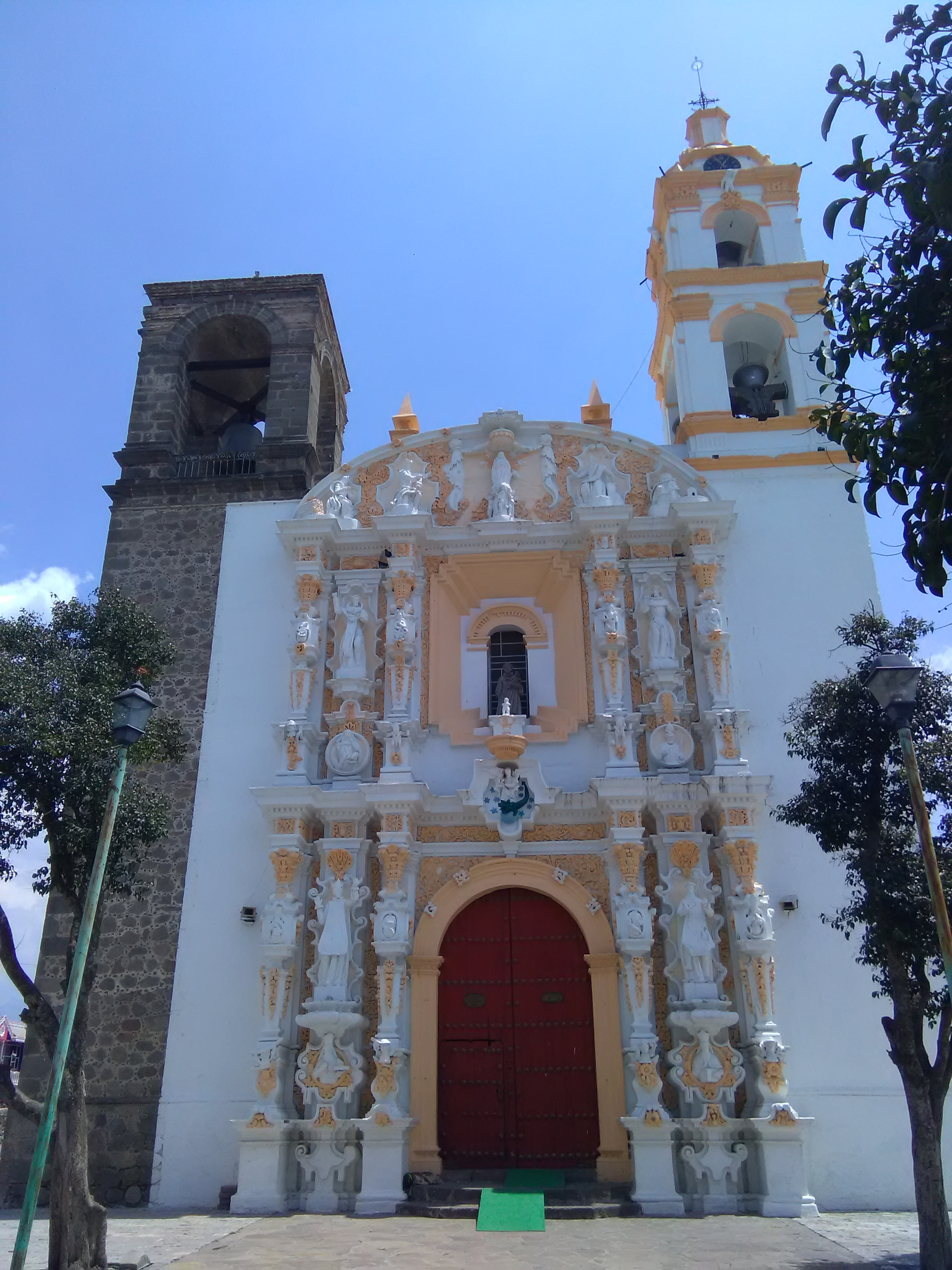
- Church of Saint Antony of Padua

- Location within Tlaxcala Location within Mexico
- Country: Mexico
- State: Tlaxcala

Government
  - Presidente municipal: María Catalina Hernández Águila
- Time zone: UTC-6 (Central)

Acuamanala de Miguel Hidalgo is a municipality in the Mexican state of Tlaxcala.
