= Contla de Juan Cuamatzi =

- Municipality
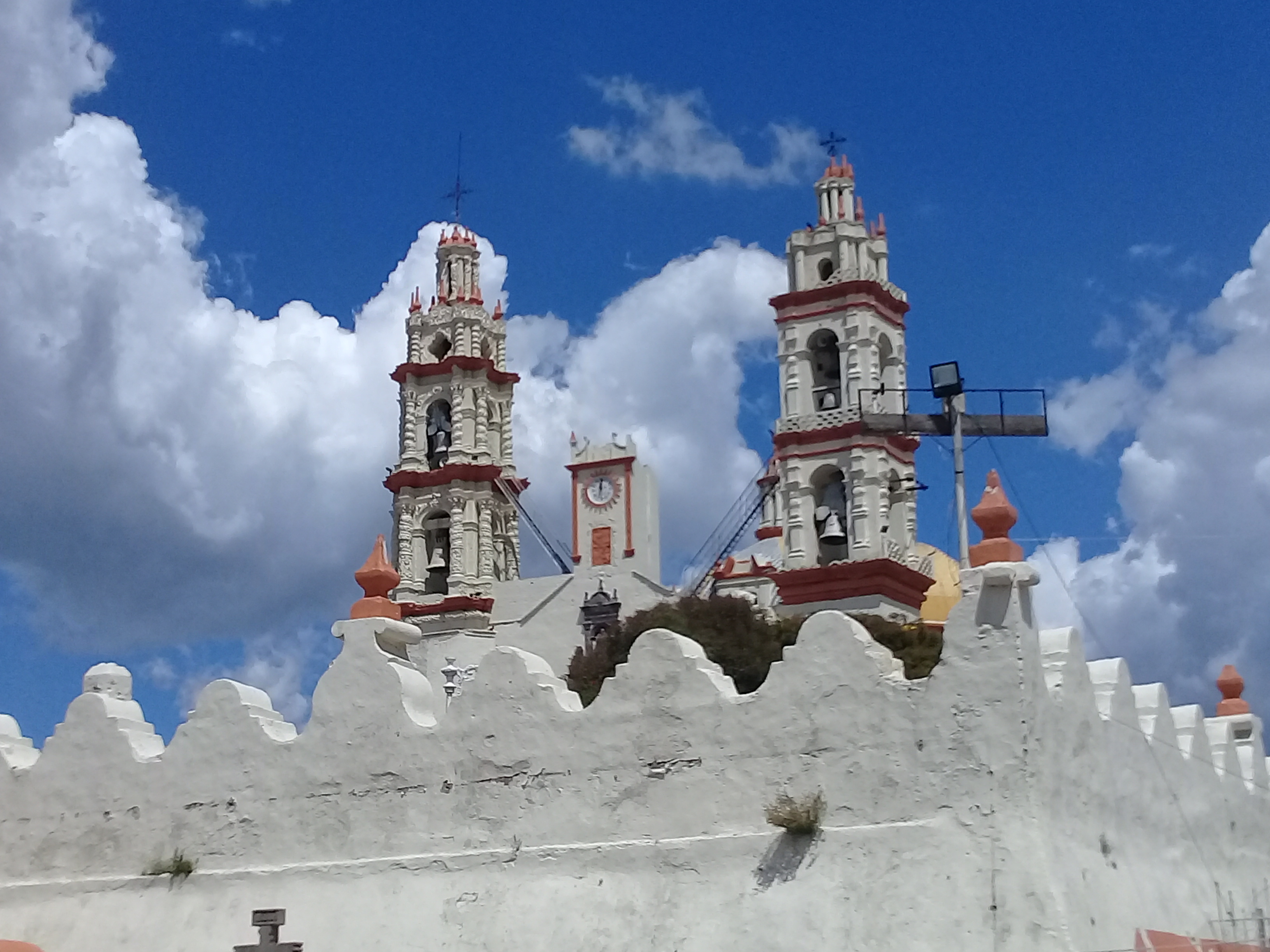

- Location within Tlaxcala Location within Mexico
- Coordinates: 19.3333°N 98.1667°W
- Country: Mexico
- State: Tlaxcala
- Time zone: UTC-6 (Central)

Contla de Juan Cuamatzi is a municipality in the Mexican state of Tlaxcala.
