= Tenancingo, Tlaxcala =

Tenancingo
- Town and Municipality

- Location within Tlaxcala Location within Mexico
- Coordinates: 19°09′N 98°12′W
- Country: Mexico
- State: Tlaxcala

Population (2020)
  - Total: 12,974
- Time zone: UTC-6 (Central)

Tenancingo is a town and its surrounding municipality in the Mexican state of Tlaxcala.

Tenancingo is now considered to be the center for sex trafficking throughout Mexico, with roots of the practice dating back to the 1970s. It is home to local organized crime operations that work in collaboration with the larger cartels: Los Zetas, Nuevo Milenio, Caballeros Templarios, and the Gulf Cartel.

== Sex trade and human trafficking ==
Of the 10,000 inhabitants of Tenancingo, it is estimated that 1,000 are sex traffickers. Local sexual exploitation, human trafficking, pimping and forced prostitution industries in Tenancingo are estimated to be worth $1 billion USD annually, with direct ties to the international sex trade. These practices have been denounced by dozens of NGOs.

Recent investigations and a documentary Pimp City: A Journey to the Center of the Sex Trade (2014), have revealed that the small town was identified by the United States Department of Justice as the leading provider of female sex slaves to the United States. According to the documentary, the entire political structure and police force of the town are implicated in human trafficking and sex trade. The U.N. estimates profits for the global human trafficking and sex trade industries at US$32 billion annually, making it the third most profitable illegal global industry.

On 11 October 2019, the Attorney General of Mexico arrested three members of a sex-trafficking ring in Tenancingo.
