= Tepeyanco =

- Municipality
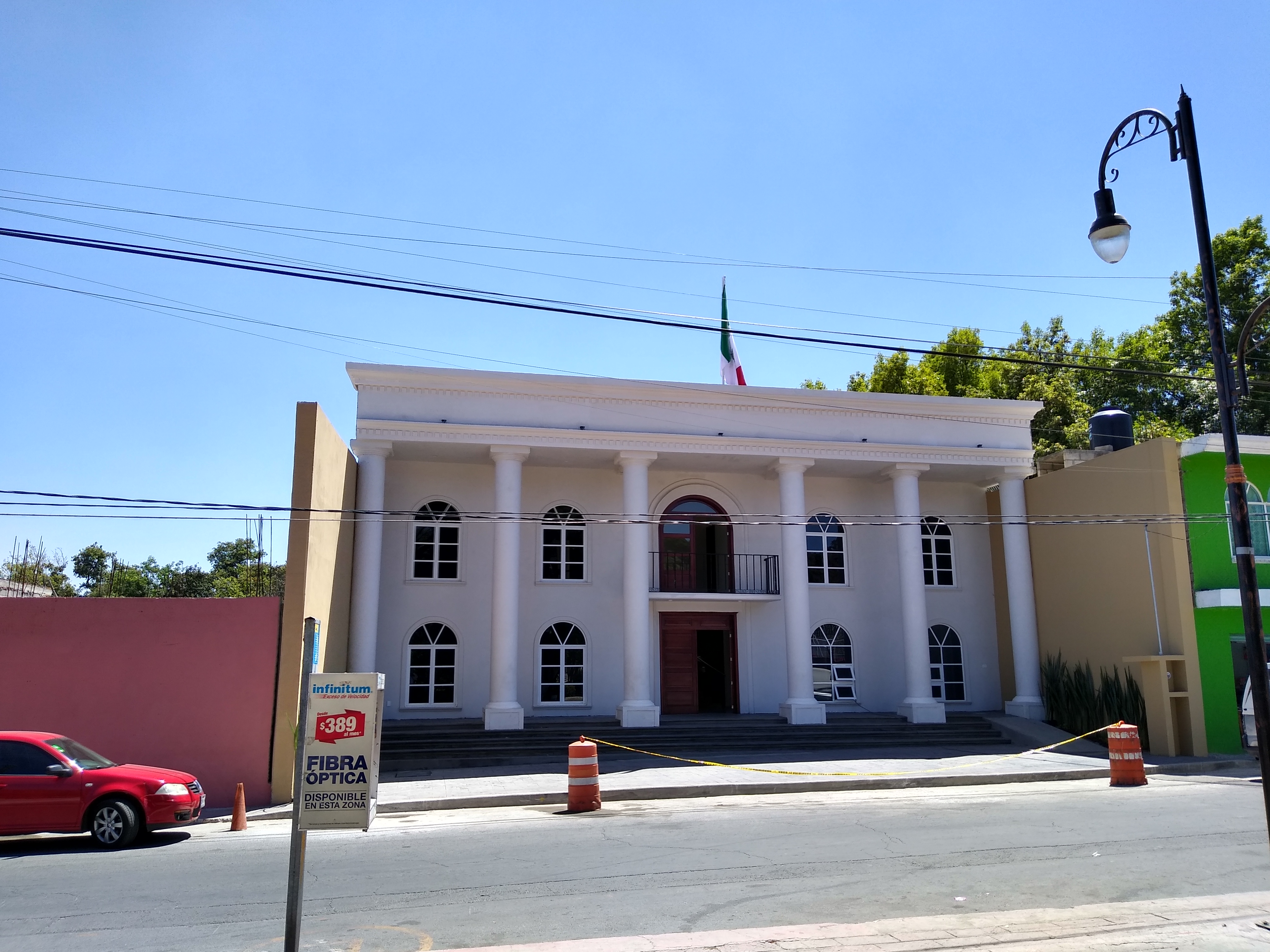
- Town hall

- Location within Tlaxcala Location within Mexico
- Coordinates: 19°15′N 98°14′W
- Country: Mexico
- State: Tlaxcala

Government
  - Presidente municipal: Bladimir Zainos Flores (2017-2021)
- Time zone: UTC-6 (Central)

Tepeyanco is a town and its surrounding municipality in the Mexican state of Tlaxcala.
