= Xicohtzinco =

- Municipality
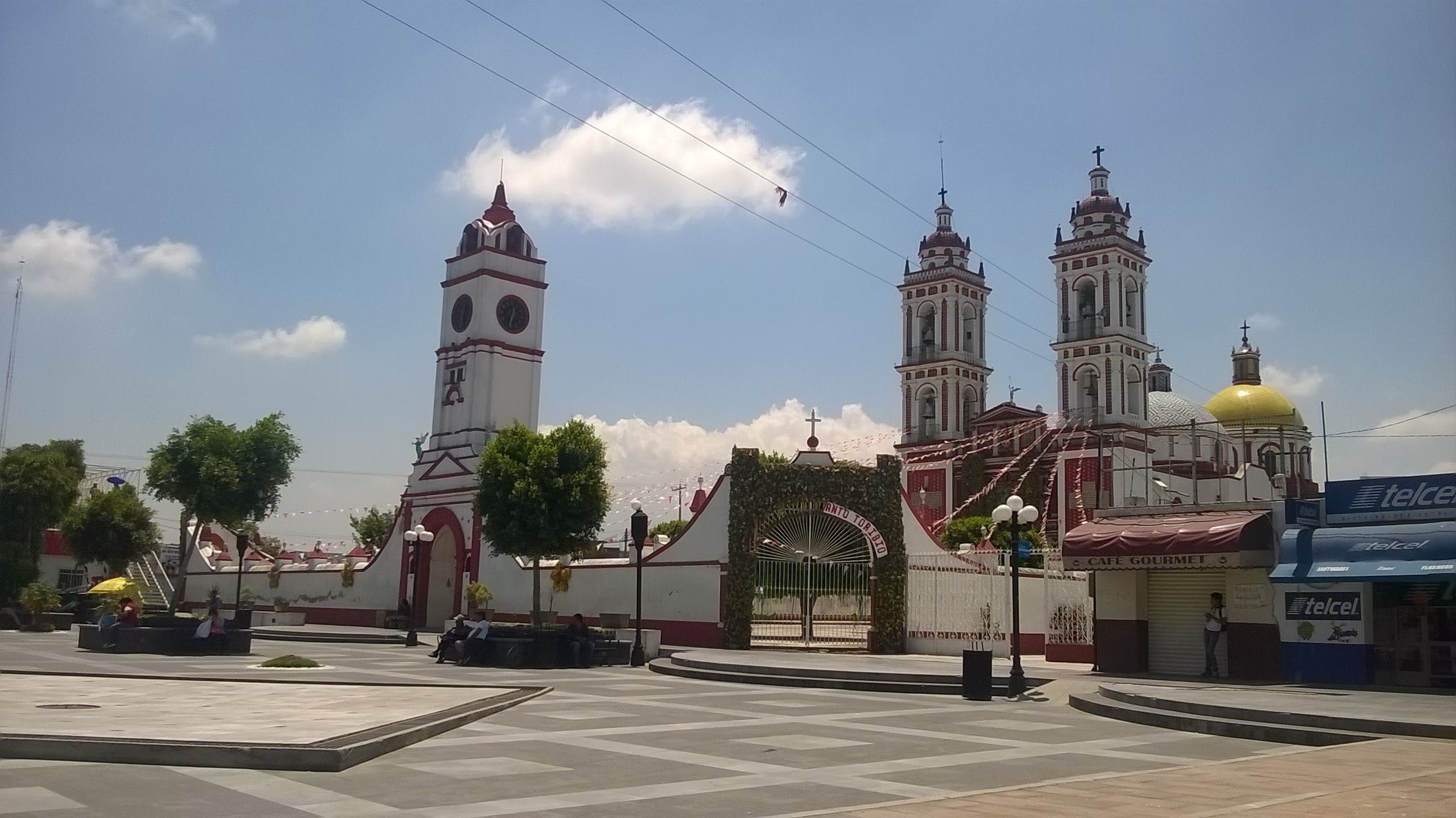
- Santo Toribio's Church

- Location within Tlaxcala Location within Mexico
- Coordinates: 19°10′N 98°14′W
- Country: Mexico
- State: Tlaxcala
- Time zone: UTC-6 (Central)

Xicohtzinco is a town and its surrounding municipality in the Mexican state of Tlaxcala.
