= Spanish conquest of the Aztec Empire =

16th-century Spanish invasion of Mesoamerica

- Part of the Spanish colonization of the Americas and Mexican Indian Wars
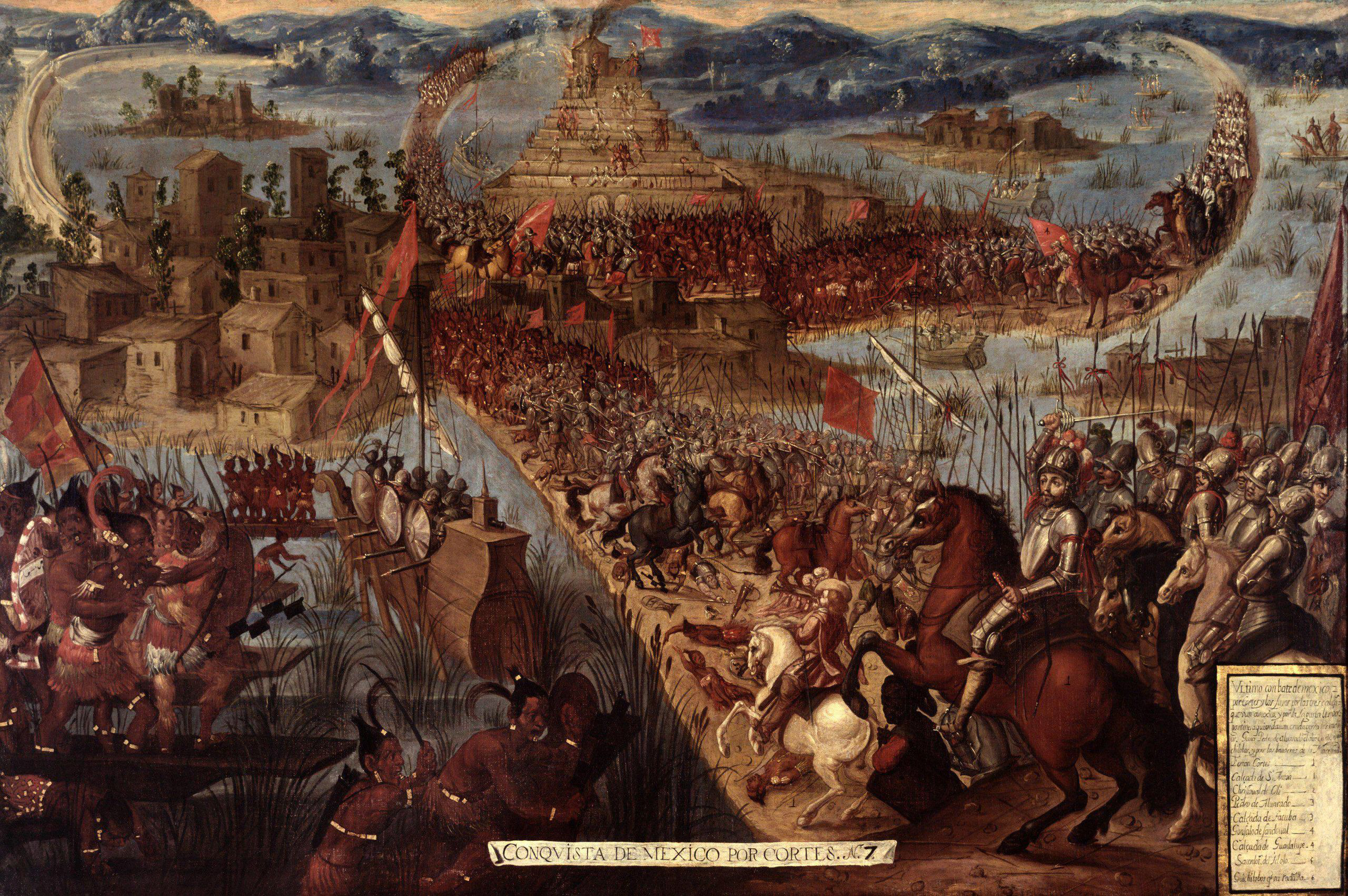
- Conquest of Mexico by Cortés, oil on canvas Spanish: Conquista de México por Cortés
Date	February 1519 – 13 August 1521 against the Aztec Empire, after 1529 – 17 February 1530 against the Purépecha Empire
Location	Aztec Empire and the other tribal states (modern-day Mexico)
Result	Spaniard - Native Indigenous coalition victory
Territorial changes	Annexation of the Aztec Empire, the Purépecha Empire, and others by the Spanish Empire; Creation of the Kingdom of New Spain

Belligerents
(Crown of Castile) Habsburg Spain: (Crown of Castile) Viceroyalty of the Indies (until 1521); (Crown of Castile) New Spain (from 1521); Indian auxiliaries: Confederacy of Tlaxcala; Tetzcoco; Totonacapan; Huejotzingo; Zaachila^{a}; Purépecha Empire (1522–1529, since 1533); Support or occasional allies^{b}: Otomi; Chalco; Xochimilco; Mixquic; Iztapalapa	(Aztec Empire) Aztec Triple Alliance (1519–1521): Tenochtitlan; Cholula; Tlatelolco; Chalco; Xochimilco; Xaltocan; Tetzcoco (partly, until 1521); Tlacopan; Allied city-states: Teotitlan; Independent kingdoms and city-states: Confederacy of Tlaxcala (1519); Purépecha Empire (1522); Metztitlan; Tututepec (1522); Yopitzinco; Colliman (1523); Xalisco; Guamare Confederacy; Other Chichimecas; Tonallan; Yaqui; Various petty city-states and tribes (map); Governorate of Cuba (1520,)

Commanders and leaders
Spanish commanders: Hernán Cortés; Pedro de Alvarado; Gonzalo de Sandoval; Cristóbal de Olid; Chichimecatecuhtli; Ixtlilxochitl II of Texcoco	Aztec commanders: Moctezuma II †; Cuitláhuac †; Cuauhtémoc (executed); Juan Velázquez; Itzquauhtzin of Tlatelolco †; Cacamatzin of Texcoco †; Coanacoch of Texcoco (executed); Tetlepanquetzal of Tlacopan (executed); Tangaxuan II (executed); Various local rulers and chieftains; Pánfilo de Narváez (WIA) (POW)

Strength
Spaniards (total): ~2,500–3,000 infantry; 90–100 cavalry; 32 guns; 13 brigantines; ~80,000–200,000 Tlaxcaltecs; ~10,000 Totonac (~8,400 followed Cortés from Cempoala) and high number of other Indian auxiliaries	200,000 Mexica-Aztecs; 100,000 Purépecha; Unknown number of other natives; 900 Spaniards at the Battle of Cempoala (1520)

Casualties and losses
1,800 Spaniards dead: 1,000 killed in battle; 15+ cannons lost; Tens of thousands of Tlaxcaltecs and Indian auxiliaries dead	200,000 Aztecs dead (including civilians): 300 war canoes sunk; Unknown casualties of other natives 15 Spaniards dead, many wounded at the Battle of Cempoala (1520)
- a. Formed an alliance with Pedro de Alvarado against Mixtecos.; b. Primarily military support against Tenochtitlan and joined the siege (1521).

The Spanish conquest of the Aztec Empire, also known as the Conquest of Mexico or Conquest of Mexico-Tenochtitlan, was a pivotal event that took place during the Spanish colonization of the Americas (the broader European colonization of the Americas), marked by the collision of the Aztec Triple Alliance and the Spanish Empire with a coalition of Native Indigenous allies. Between 1519 and 1521, Spanish conquistador Hernán Cortés, his small army of European soldiers and the large allied army of Indian auxiliaries, overthrew the most powerful pre-Columbian empire to exist in Mesoamerica.

Led by the Aztec ruler Moctezuma II, the Aztec Empire had established dominance over modern central Mexico through military conquest and intricate alliances. The Aztecs ruled hegemonically through local rulers, their power resting on the perception of unchallengeable Aztec military supremacy. This was an inherently unstable system vulnerable to a loss of prestige under even moderate challenges. The sudden downfall of the Aztec civilization was due to a combination of factors, including European superior weaponry, strategic alliances with oppressed and rebellious American Indian populations, and the impact of European diseases. In 1520, the first wave of smallpox killed 5–8 million people.

The Spanish campaign against the Aztec Empire had its final victory on 13 August 1521, when a coalition army of Spanish Armed forces under Cortés and Tlaxcalan Indian warriors led by Indian commander Chichimecatecuhtli captured the Aztec emperor Cuauhtémoc and the Aztec capital Tenochtitlan. The fall of Tenochtitlan marks the establishment of New Spain, as part of the Spanish Empire, with its capital being Mexico City, built on the ruins of the former empire's capital.

The conquest had profound impact, beginning Spanish rule in Mesoamerica, the wide expansion of Spanish culture, and the establishment of a new social hierarchy in Latin America dominated by the Spanish conquerors and their descendants.

== Significant events in the conquest of Mesoamerica ==
Following a 1518 expedition to Yucatán led by Juan de Grijalva, in 1519 Hernán Cortés set sail on an expedition (entrada) to what is today Mexico. Cortés made alliances with tributary city-states of the Aztec Empire (altepetl) as well as with their political rivals, particularly the Tlaxcaltecs and the Tetzcocans, a former partner in the Aztec Triple Alliance. Other city-states also joined, including Cempoala and Huejotzingo, as well as polities bordering Lake Texcoco, the inland lake system of the Valley of Mexico. Particularly important to the Spanish success was a multilingual Nahua Mayan- and Spanish-speaking woman enslaved by the Mayas, known to the Spanish conquistadors as Doña Marina, and later as La Malinche.

Eight months of battles and negotiations overcame the resistance of the Aztec Emperor Moctezuma II (also spelled Motecuhzoma) to the entrance of the Spanish. Cortés arrived in Tenochtitlan on 8 November 1519, where his men and Indigenous allies took up residence. When news reached Cortés of the death of several of his men during the Aztec attack on the Totonacs in Veracruz, Cortés claims that he took Moctezuma captive. Capturing the cacique or Indigenous ruler was a common tactic for the Spanish in their expansion in the Caribbean, but modern scholars are skeptical that Cortés took Moctezuma captive at this time. Despite his legal claims of capturing the ruler, critical analysis of Spanish personal writings suggest Moctezuma was not taken until later.

At this time Diego Velázquez de Cuéllar, Spanish governor of Cuba, tried to recall Cortés in favor of a new expedition led by Pánfilo de Narváez. Cortés left Tenochtitlan to defend his own expedition, leaving Pedro de Alvarado in charge of Tenochtitlan. Cortés led a small army to the coast and attacked Narváez at night. After defeating Narváez's fleet, Cortés won over most of the crew to his side, promising them great riches. Upon returning to Tenochtitlan with his enlarged force, Cortés received news from Alvarado that "the Aztec had risen against the Spanish garrison" during a religious celebration, and Alvarado had ordered his army to massacre the unarmed crowd. Under heavy attack by the Aztecs, Cortés decided to escape. During the following Noche Triste (sorrowful night), about "400 Spaniards, 4000 native allies and many horses [were killed] before reaching the mainland". Moctezuma was killed, although sources disagree on who killed him. By one account, Moctezuma, now seen by his people as a puppet of the Spaniards, was killed by a hurled stone as he attempted to calm the outraged crowd. An Indigenous account says he was killed by the Spanish.

The Spanish, Tlaxcalans and reinforcements returned a year later on 13 August 1521, to a civilization weakened by famine and smallpox, with little remaining ability to resist. The Spaniards' victory is attributed to their help from Indigenous allies and their more advanced technology. In the heat of battle, cavalry was the "arm of decision in the conquest" and "the key ingredient in the Spanish forces".

However, the role of smallpox is often underestimated. According to Hassig, "It is true that cannons, guns, crossbows, steel blades, horses and war dogs were advanced on the Aztecs' weaponry. But the advantage these gave a few hundred Spanish soldiers was not overwhelming." In the words of Restall, "Spanish weapons were useful for breaking the offensive lines of waves of indigenous warriors, but this was no formula for conquest ... rather, it was a formula for survival, until Spanish and indigenous reinforcements arrived."

The integration of the allies from Tlaxcala and Texcoco into the Spanish army played a crucial role in the conquest. These alliances not only expanded the Spanish ranks, but also provided essential guidance on local geography and effective tactics against Aztec defenses, informing the timing of the campaign and exploiting the beliefs of both groups. At the same time, the alienness of the Spaniards, their ignorance of the empire's power structure, made them unpredictable to their enemies: "A direct attack on a city as mighty as Tenochtitlan was unlikely and unexpected." The Aztecs never thought an attacking army would come unannounced.

Many of those on the Cortés expedition of 1519 had never seen combat before, including Cortés. A whole generation of Spaniards later participated in expeditions in the Caribbean and Tierra Firme (Central America), learning strategy and tactics. Nevertheless, the Spanish conquest of Mexico had antecedents in earlier practices.

=== Timeline ===
- 1428 – Creation of the Triple Alliance of Tenochtitlan, Texcoco, and Tlacopan
- 1492–93 – Columbus reaches the Caribbean; start of permanent Spanish settlements
- 1493–1515 – Spanish exploration, conquest, enslavement, and settlement in the Caribbean and the Spanish Main
- 1502 – Moctezuma II elected huey tlatoani, emperor [literally: "Great Speaker"] of the Aztec Triple Alliance
- 1503–09 – Moctezuma's coronation conquests
- 1504 – Hernan Cortés arrives in the Caribbean
- 1511– Spanish viceroy in the Caribbean appoints Diego Velázquez to conquer and govern Cuba
- 1515 – Texcocan monarch Nezahualpilli dies; Cacamatzin succeeds to the throne; the rebellion of Ixtlilxochitl
- 1517 – Expedition of Francisco Hernández de Córdoba to the Yucatán coast
- 1517- City of Cholollan secedes from Tlaxcalteca Alliance, becomes a tributary state of the Aztec Triple Alliance
- 1518 – Expedition of Juan de Grijalva to the Yucatán and Gulf coasts; appointment of Cortés to lead a third exploratory expedition

1519

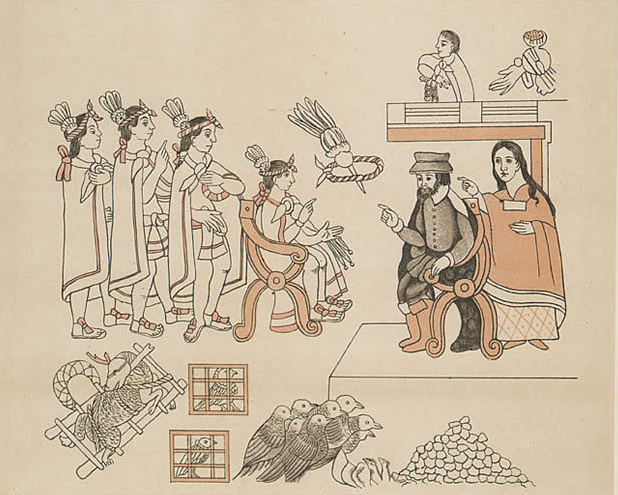
Cortés and his counselor, the Nahua woman La Malinche, meet Moctezuma in Tenochtitlan, 8 November 1519.

- 10 February – Cortés expedition leaves Cuba, taking Hernández de Córdoba's route. In the process, Cortés ignores Velásquez's cancellation of the expedition
- Early 1519 – Gerónimo de Aguilar, shipwrecked Spaniard, bilingual in Yoko Ochoko, joins Cortés

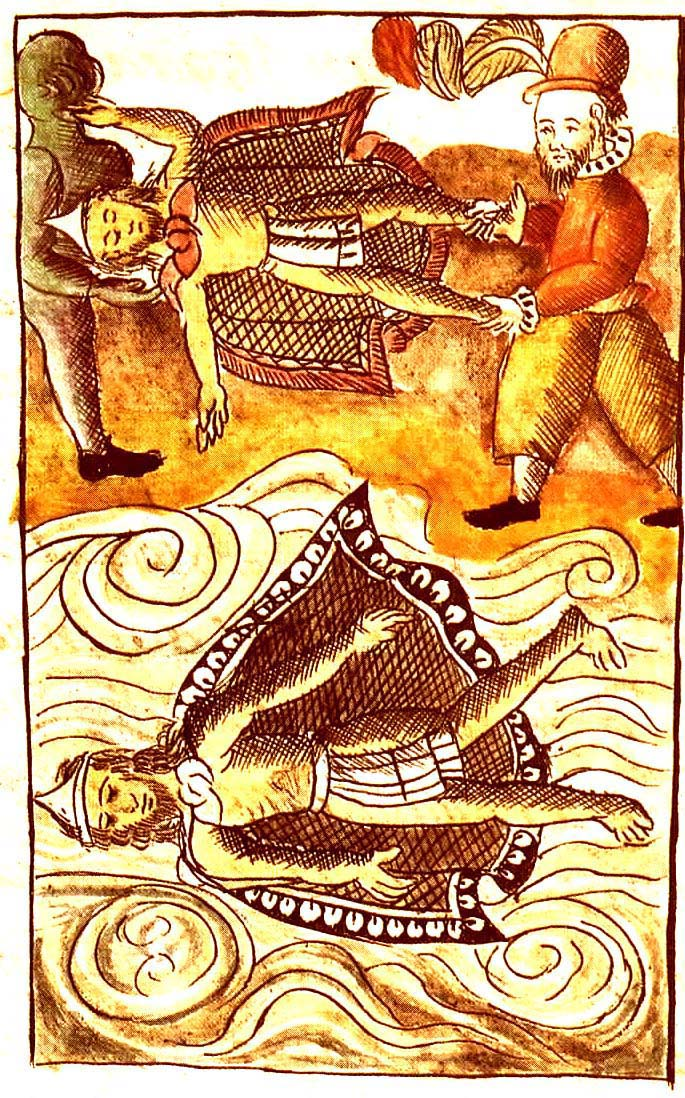
The death of Moctezuma, depicted in the Florentine Codex

- 24 March – Leaders of Potoncan sue Spaniards for peace and gift the Spaniards, 20 slave women. One of the enslaved Nahua woman (known as La Malinche, Doña Marina, Malintze, and Malintzin), is multilingual and will serve as one of the main translators for the expedition.
- 21 April – Expedition lands in the Gulf coast near San Juan de Ullúa
- Early June – Cortés establishes the colony of Villa Rica de la Vera Cruz and relocates the company to a beach near the settlement of Quiahuiztlan. Afterward, the Spaniards travel to Cempoala and formalize an alliance with Xicomecoatl (also known as the Fat Chief and Cacique Gordo), the leader of Cempoala. At this time, Cempoala is the capital of the Totonac confederacy.
- July/August – Cortés' soldiers desecrate Cempoala
- 16 August – Spaniards and Totonac allies embark on march toward the Valley of Tenochtitlan, passing Citlatapetl and many other notable geographic landmarks like Cofre de Perote
- 31 August – Tlaxcalteca attack Spaniards after entering the territory of Tlaxcallan. They succeed in killing two horsemen.
- September – Tlaxcalteca assault the Spanish camp by day, and the Spanish respond by raiding unarmed Tlaxcalteca towns and villages by night. Tlaxcallan brokers a peace after 18 punishing days of war, by which point the Spaniards had lost half their cavalry and 1/5 their men.
- October – March to Cholula. Conquistadors massacre unarmed Cholulans, then Spanish-Tlaxcala combine forces to sack Cholollan, and replace Cholulan political leadership with Tlaxcallan-favoring nobles. The massacre broke out for disputed reasons, perhaps to quash an impending Cholulan attack or to fulfill a Tlaxcalteca plan to both exact revenge on Cholollan for its secession and to test their new Spanish allies.
- 8 November 1519 – Meeting of Cortés and Moctezuma

1520

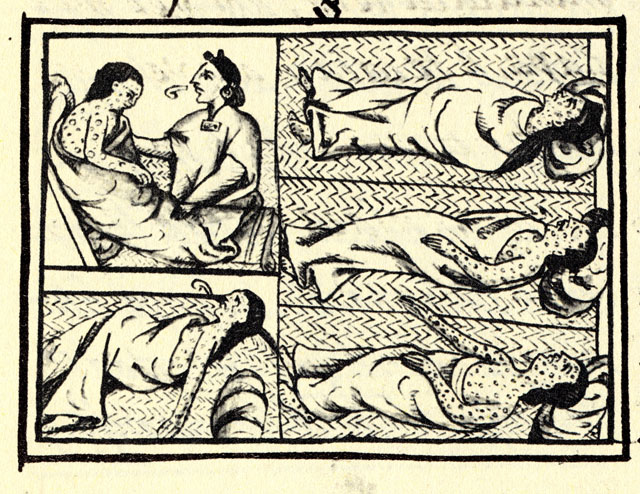
Smallpox depicted in Book XII on the conquest of Mexico in the Florentine Codex

- April or May – Pánfilo de Narváez arrives on the Gulf coast, sent by Governor Velázquez to rein in Cortés
- Mid-May – Pedro de Alvarado massacres Aztec elites celebrating the Festival of Toxcatl
- Late May – Cortés forces attack Narvárez's forces at Cempoala; incorporation of those Spaniards into Cortés's forces
- 24 June – Spanish forces return to Tenochtitlan
- Late June – Uprising in Tenochtitlan; the death of Moctezuma in unclear circumstances, perhaps killed by the Spaniards, perhaps by his own people; deaths of other leaders of the Triple Alliance
- 30 June – "La Noche Triste" – Evacuation of Spanish-Tlaxcalteca allied forces from Tenochtitlan; deaths of perhaps 1,000 Spaniards and 1,000 Tlaxcalans
- 7 July – Battle of Otumba, Aztec forces attack the Spanish-Tlaxcalteca forces at Otumba
- 11 or 12 July – Retreat to Tlaxcala
- 1 August – Spanish punitive expedition in Tepeaca in reprisal for the murder of Spaniards by its inhabitants.
- Mid-September – Coronation of Cuitlahuac as Moctezuma's successor
- Mid-October to mid-December – Smallpox epidemic; death of Cuitlahuac on 4 December, perhaps of smallpox
- Late December – Spanish-Tlaxcaltec forces return to the Valley of Mexico; join with Texcoca forces of Ixtlilxochitl

1521

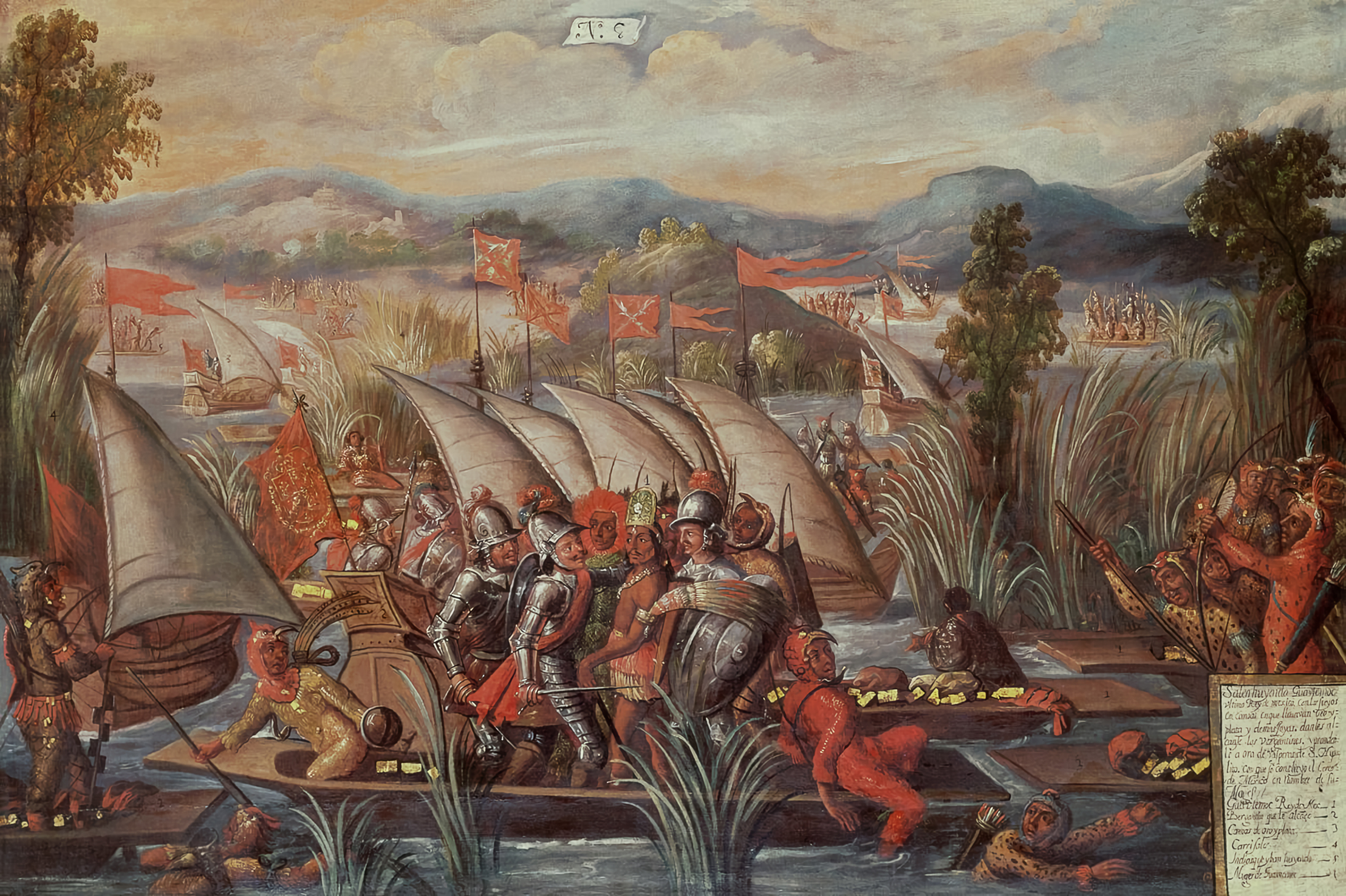
The Capture of Cuauhtemoc, 17th century, oil on canvas

- Late January – Cuauhtemoc elected huey tlatoani of Tenochtitlan
- February – Combined Spanish-Tlaxcalteca-Texcoca forces attack Xaltocan and Tlacopan; Texcoco becomes the base of operations for the campaign against Tenochtitlan
- Early April – Attacks against Yautepec and Cuernavaca, following by sacking
- Mid-April – Combined forces defeated by the Xochimilcans, Tenochtitlan's ally
- Late April – Construction of 13 shallow-bottomed brigantines by Tlaxcalteca laborers under Spanish supervision; mounted with cannon; launched into Lake Texcoco, allowing Spanish control of the inland sea
- 10 May – Start of the siege of Tenochtitlan; potable water from Chapultepec cut off
- 30 June – Defeat of Spanish-Tlaxcalteca forces on a causeway; capture and ritual sacrifice of the Spaniards and their horses in Tenochtitlan
- July – Spanish ships land at Veracruz with large numbers of Spaniards, munitions, and horses
- 20–25 July – Battle for Tenochtitlan
- 1 August – Spanish-Tlaxcalan-Texcocan forces enter the Plaza Mayor; last stand of the Aztec defenders
- 13 August – Surrender of Aztec defenders; capture of Cuauhtemoc
- 13–17 August – Wholesale sacking and violence against the survivors in Tenochtitlan

1522

- October – Charles V, Holy Roman Emperor names Cortés captain-general of New Spain, the Spanish name for central Mexico.
- November – Death of Cortés's wife, Catalina Suárez, in Coyoacan, where Cortés was resident while the new capital Mexico City was constructed on the ruins of Tenochtitlan
- Cortés's Second Letter to the crown is published in Seville, Spain

1524

- Arrival of the first twelve Franciscan missionaries to Mexico, beginning of the "spiritual conquest" to convert the indigenous populations to Christianity
- Conqueror Cristóbal de Olid's expedition to Honduras; renounces Cortés' authority; Cortés expedition to Honduras with the captive Cuauhtemoc

1525

- February – execution of the three rulers of the former Triple Alliance, including Cuauhtemoc
- Don Juan Velázquez Tlacotzin, former "viceroy" (cihuacoatl) appointed governor of the indigenous sector of Mexico City

1525–1530

- Spanish conquest of Guatemala

1527–1547

- Spanish conquest of Chiapas

== Sources for the conquest of Mesoamerica ==
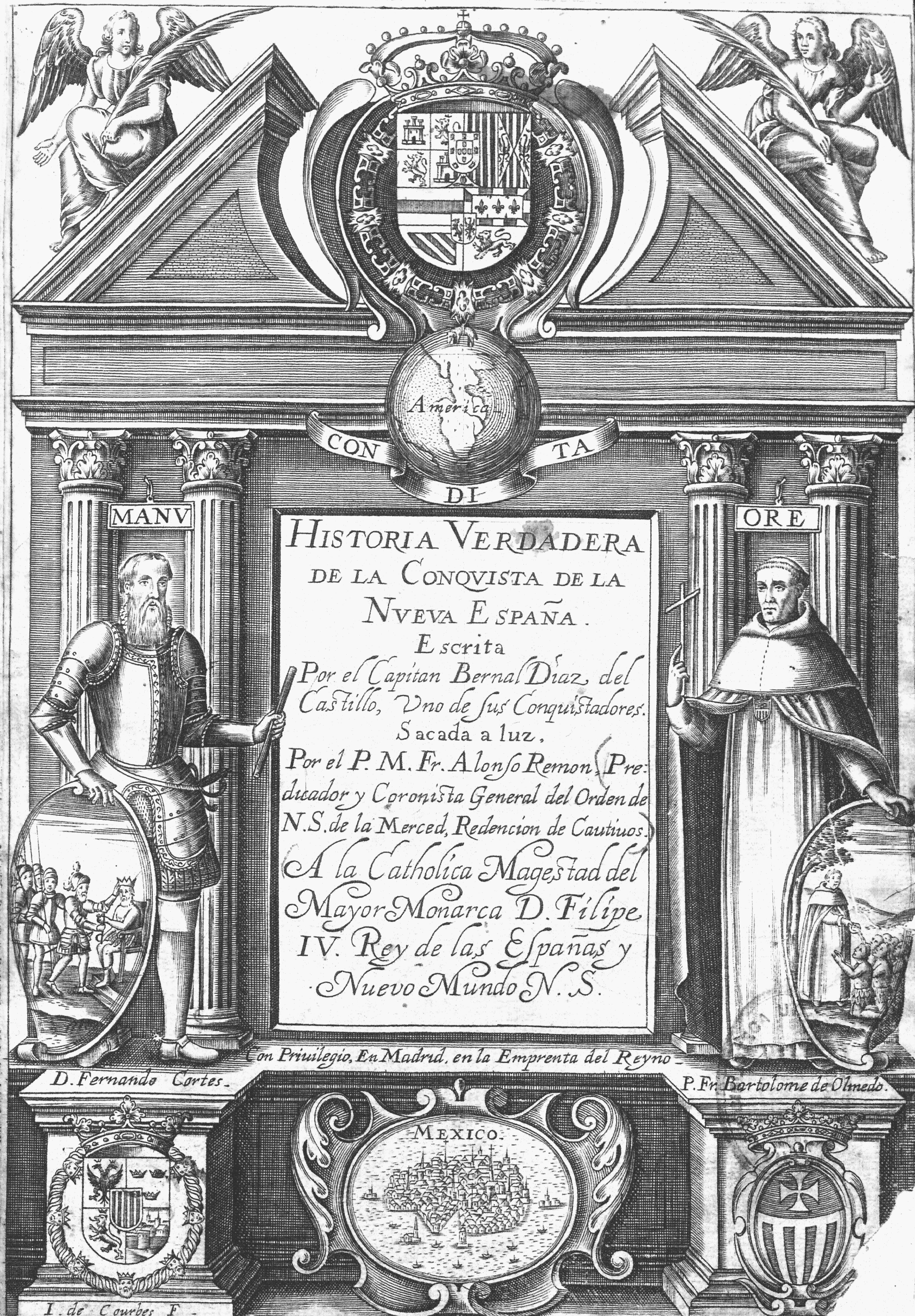
Bernal Díaz del Castillo's True History of the Conquest of New Spain

The conquest of Mexico, the initial destruction of the great pre-Columbian civilizations, is a significant event in world history. The conquest was well documented by a variety of sources with differing points of view, including indigenous accounts, by both allies and opponents. Accounts by the Spanish conquerors exist from the first landfall at Veracruz, Mexico (on Good Friday, 22 April 1519) to the final victory over the Mexica in Tenochtitlan on 13 August 1521. Notably, the accounts of the conquest, Spanish and indigenous alike, have biases and exaggerations. Some, though not all, Spanish accounts downplay the support of their indigenous allies. Conquerors' accounts exaggerate individual contributions to the Conquest at the expense of their comrades, while indigenous allies' accounts stress their loyalty and importance to victory for the Spanish. These accounts are similar to Spanish conquerors' accounts contained in petitions for rewards, known as benemérito petitions.

Two lengthy accounts from the defeated indigenous viewpoint were created under the direction of Spanish friars, Franciscan Bernardino de Sahagún and Dominican Diego Durán, using indigenous informants.

Because Nahuatl did not have a full alphabet, the majority of extant indigenous sources are recollections of Nahuatl-speakers who were subsequently introduced to Latin characters after the arrival of the Spanish. Gingerish identifies the Annals of Tlatelolco (1524?–1528) as "One of the oldest recorded manuscripts in Nahuatl, written presumably by a native who must have learned the use of Latin characters and alphabet within three or four years of the conquest."

Lockhart, however, argues for a later post-1540 date for this manuscript, and indeed the majority of indigenous source material was recorded a generation or more after the events through interaction with and under influence of Spanish priests. As noted in, "No 'pure' Nahuatl text exists – with the exception of a few pre- Cortesian pictographic codices. Every written Nahuatl text was recorded after 1521 either directly by a Christian priest, by students who worked directly under priestly supervision, or by former students who had studied in Christian schools long enough to understand the necessity of the new religion. The written language was a personal possession of the noble and priestly class."

The first Spanish account of the conquest was written by lead conqueror Hernán Cortés, who sent a series of letters to the Spanish monarch Charles V, giving a contemporary account of the conquest from his point of view, in which he justified his actions. These were almost immediately published in Spain and later in other parts of Europe. Much later, Spanish conqueror Bernal Díaz del Castillo, a well-seasoned participant in the conquest of Central Mexico, wrote what he called The True History of the Conquest of New Spain, countering the account by Cortés's official biographer, Francisco López de Gómara. Bernal Díaz's account had begun as a benemérito petition for rewards but he expanded it to encompass a full history of his earlier expeditions in the Caribbean and Tierra Firme and the conquest of the Aztec. A number of lower rank Spanish conquerors wrote benemérito petitions to the Spanish Crown, requesting rewards for their services in the conquest, including Juan Díaz, Andrés de Tapia, García del Pilar, and Fray Francisco de Aguilar. Cortés's right-hand man, Pedro de Alvarado did not write at any length about his actions in the New World, and died as a man of action in the Mixtón War in 1541. Two letters to Cortés about Alvarado's campaigns in Guatemala are published in The Conquistadors.

The chronicle of the so-called "Anonymous Conqueror" was written sometime in the sixteenth century, entitled in an early twentieth-century translation to English as Narrative of Some Things of New Spain and of the Great City of Temestitan (i.e. Tenochtitlan). Rather than it being a petition for rewards for services, as many Spanish accounts were, the Anonymous Conqueror made observations about the indigenous situation at the time of the conquest. The account was used by eighteenth-century Jesuit Francisco Javier Clavijero in his descriptions of the history of Mexico.

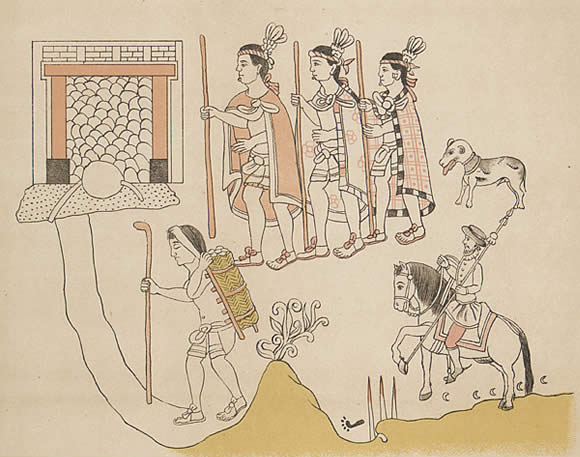
Tlaxcalan allies of the Spanish, showing their leaders, porters, as well as a Spanish warrior and a Spanish war dog. Lienzo de Tlaxcala

On the indigenous side, the allies of Cortés, particularly the Tlaxcalans, wrote extensively about their services to the Spanish Crown in the conquest, arguing for special privileges for themselves. The most important of these are the pictorial Lienzo de Tlaxcala (1585) and the Historia de Tlaxcala by Diego Muñoz Camargo. Less successfully, the Nahua allies from Huexotzinco (or Huejotzinco) near Tlaxcala argued that their contributions had been overlooked by the Spanish. In a letter in Nahuatl to the Spanish Crown, the indigenous lords of Huexotzinco lay out their case in for their valorous service. The letter has been published in Nahuatl and English translation by James Lockhart in We People Here: Nahuatl Accounts of the Conquest of Mexico in 1991. Texcoco patriot and member of a noble family there, Fernando Alva Ixtlilxochitl, likewise petitioned the Spanish Crown, in Spanish, saying that Texcoco had not received sufficient rewards for their support of the conquistadors, particularly after the Spanish were forced out of Tenochtitlan.

The best-known indigenous account of the conquest is Book 12 of Bernardino de Sahagún's General History of the Things of New Spain and published as the Florentine Codex, in parallel columns of Nahuatl and Spanish, with pictorials. Less well-known is Sahagún's 1585 revision of the conquest account, which shifts from the indigenous viewpoint entirely and inserts at crucial junctures passages lauding the Spanish and in particular Hernán Cortés. Another indigenous account compiled by a Spanish friar is Dominican Diego Durán's The History of the Indies of New Spain, from 1581, with many color illustrations.

A text from the Nahua point of view, the Anales de Tlatelolco, an early indigenous account in Nahuatl, perhaps from 1540, remained in indigenous hands until it was published. An extract of this important manuscript was published in 1991 by James Lockhart in Nahuatl transcription and English translation. A popular anthology in English for classroom use is Miguel León-Portilla's, The Broken Spears: The Aztec Accounts of the Conquest of Mexico from 1992. Not surprisingly, many publications and republications of sixteenth-century accounts of the conquest of Mexico appeared around 1992, the 500th anniversary of Christopher Columbus's first voyage, when scholarly and popular interest in first encounters surged.

A popular and enduring narrative of the Spanish campaign in central Mexico is by New England-born nineteenth-century historian William Hickling Prescott. His History of the Conquest of Mexico, first published in 1843, remains an important unified narrative synthesis of the conquest. Prescott read and used all the formal writings from the sixteenth century, although few had been published by the mid-nineteenth century when he was writing. It is likely that a 1585 revision of Bernardino de Sahagún's account of the conquest survives today only in the form of a copy because it was made in Spain for Prescott's project from a now-lost original. Although scholars of the modern era point out its biases and shortcomings, "there is nowhere they can get as good a unified narrative of the main events, crises, and course of the Mexican conquest as Prescott's version."

=== Aztec omens for the conquest ===
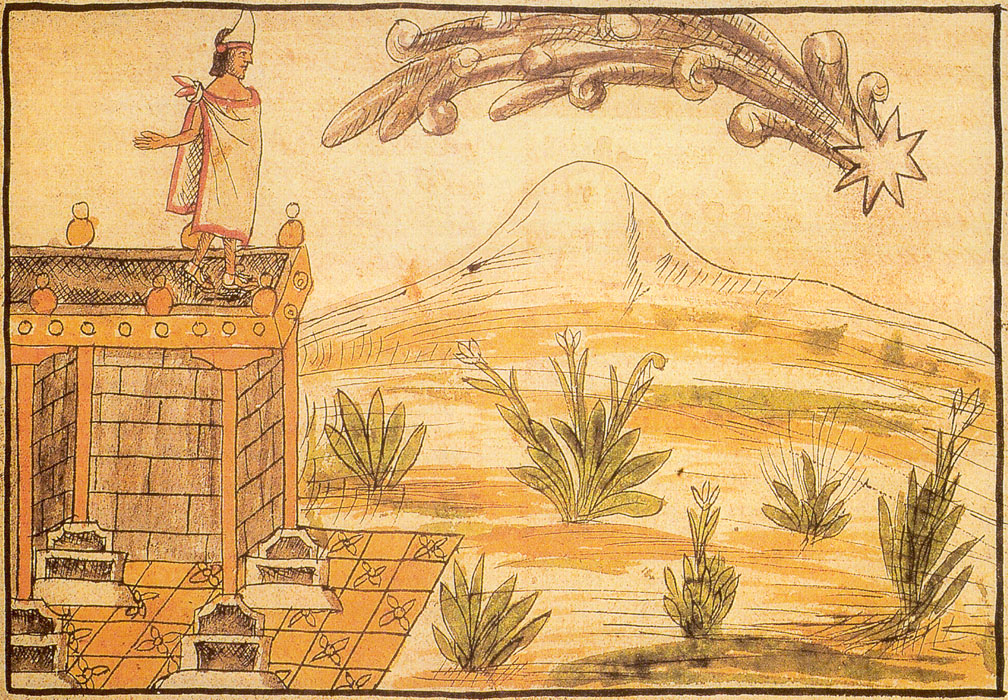
A comet seen by Moctezuma, interpreted as a sign of impending peril. Diego Durán's account from indigenous informants.

In the sources recorded by Franciscan Bernardino de Sahagún and Dominican Diego Durán in the mid to late sixteenth century, there are accounts of events that were interpreted as supernatural omens of the conquest. These two accounts are full-blown narratives from the viewpoint of the Spanish opponents. Most first-hand accounts about the conquest of the Aztec Empire were written by Spaniards: Hernán Cortés' letters to Charles V, Holy Roman Emperor and the first-person narrative of Bernal Díaz del Castillo, The True History of the Conquest of New Spain. The primary sources from the native people affected as a result of the conquest are seldom used, because they tend to reflect the views of a particular native group, such as the Tlaxcalans. Indigenous accounts were written in pictographs as early as 1525. Later accounts were written in the native tongue of the Aztec and other native peoples of central Mexico, Nahuatl.

The native texts of the defeated Mexica narrating their version of the conquest describe eight omens that were believed to have occurred nine years prior to the arrival of the Spanish from the Gulf of Mexico.

In 1510, Aztec Emperor Moctezuma II was visited by Nezahualpilli, who had a reputation as a great seer, as well as being the tlatoani of Texcoco. Nezahualpilli warned Moctezuma that he must be on guard, for in a few years Aztec cities would be destroyed. Before leaving, he said that there would be omens for Moctezuma to know that what he has been told is true. Over the years, and especially after Nezhualpilli's death in 1515, several supernatural omens appeared.

The eight bad omens or wonders:

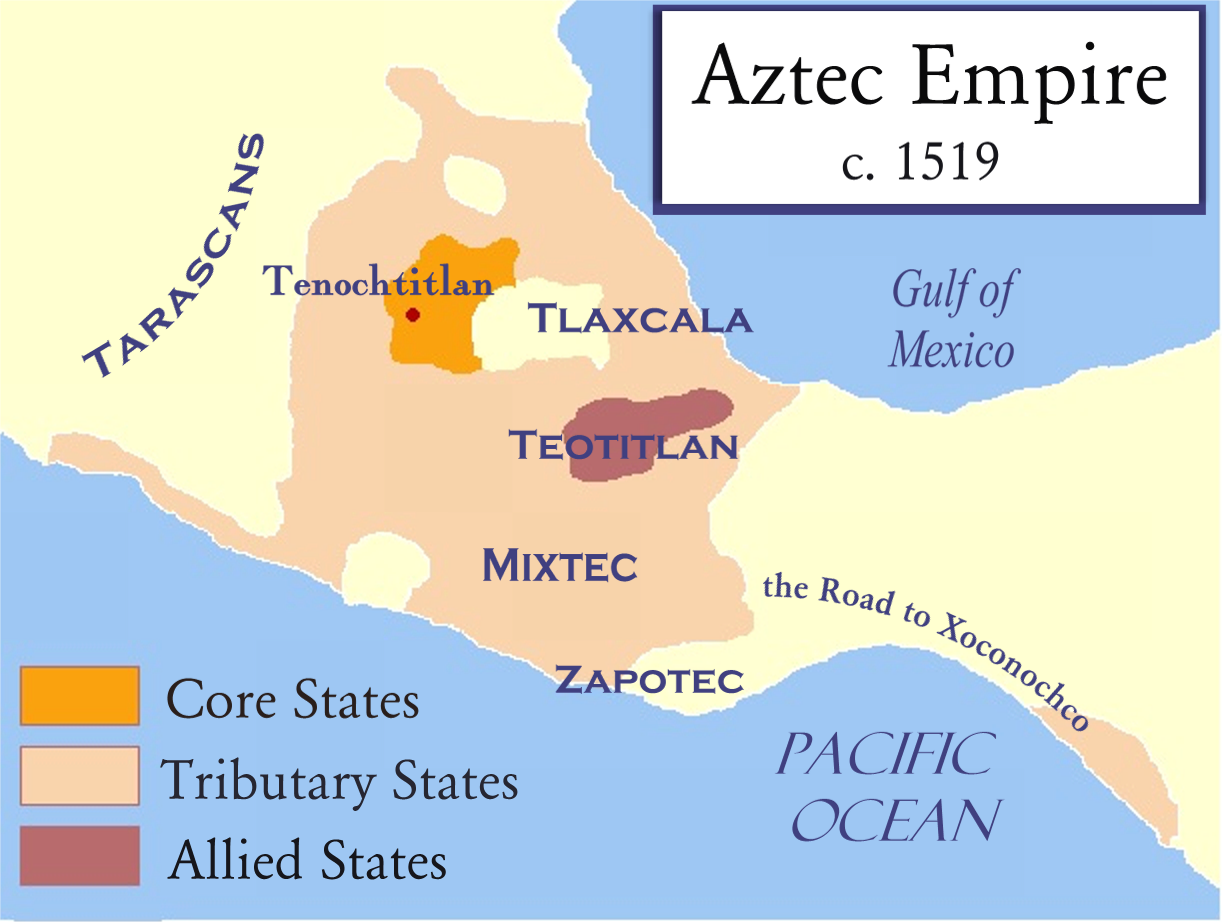
Aztec empire on the eve of the Spanish Invasion

1. A column of fire that appeared from midnight until dawn, and seemed to rain fire in the year 1517 (12-House)
2. Fire consuming the temple of Huitzilopochtli
3. A lightning bolt destroying the straw temple of Xiuhtecuhtli
4. The appearance of fire, or comets, streaming across the sky in threes during the day
5. The "boiling deep", and water flooding, of a lake nearby Tenochtitlan
6. A woman, Cihuatcoatl, weeping in the middle of the night for them (the Aztecs) to "flee far away from this city"
7. Montezuma II saw the stars of mamalhuaztli, and images of fighting men riding "on the backs of animals resembling deer", in a mirror on the crown of a bird caught by fishermen
8. A two headed man, tlacantzolli, running through the streets

Additionally, the Tlaxcala saw a "radiance that shone in the east every morning three hours before sunrise", and a "whirlwind of dust" from the volcano Matlalcueye. According to Diaz, "These Caciques also told us of a tradition they had heard from their ancestors, that one of the idols which they particularly worshipped had prophesied the coming of men from distant lands in the direction of the sunrise, who would conquer them and rule them." Some accounts would claim that this idol or deity was Quetzalcoatl, and that the Aztecs were defeated because they believed the Spanish were supernatural and did not know how to react, although whether or not the Aztecs really believed that is debatable.

Omens were extremely important to the Aztecs, who believed that history repeated itself. A number of modern scholars cast doubt on whether such omens occurred or whether they were ex post facto (retrospective) creations to help the Mexica explain their defeat. Some scholars contend that "the most likely interpretation of the story of these portents is that some, if not all, had occurred" but concede that it is very likely that "clever Mexicans and friars, writing later of the Mexican empire, were happy to link those memories with what they know occurred in Europe.

Many sources depicting omens and the return of old Aztec gods, including those supervised by Spanish priests, were written after the fall of Tenochtitlan in 1521. Spanish accounts tended to incorporate omens to emphasize what they saw as the preordained nature of the conquest and their success as Spanish destiny. This influenced some natives writing under the tutelage of the Franciscan friars. Other explanations include a desire to please the Spaniards or resentment toward the failure of Montezuma and Tenochtitlan warriors."

==== Cortés and Quetzalcoatl ====
Hugh Thomas writes that Moctezuma was debating whether Cortés was a god or the ambassador of a great king in another land. Because the Spaniards arrived in 1519, Moctezuma knew this was the year of Ce Acatl, which is the year Quetzalcoatl was promised to return. Previously, during Juan de Grijalva's expedition, Moctezuma believed that those men were heralds of Quetzalcoatl, as Moctezuma, as well as everyone else in the Aztec Empire, were to believe that eventually, Quetzalcoatl will return. Moctezuma even had glass beads that were left behind by Grijalva brought to Tenochtitlan and they were regarded as sacred religious relics.

On the other hand, some ethnohistorians say the Aztec leaders did not view the Spaniards as supernatural in any sense but rather as simply another group of powerful outsiders. They believe that Moctezuma responded rationally to the Spanish invasion and did not think the Spanish were supernatural. In his own letters written on the spot, Cortés never claimed that he was perceived as a god. The idea appears to emerge only in the 1540s, in writings by Europeans. Nonetheless, it was repeated in many sources, even among Indians, especially those who had become students of the Franciscan friars and were searching for an explanation for how the Aztecs had fallen. This was complicated by the word teules that the Nahuas used to refer to the Spaniards, who claimed to represent their Christian god and originated from a land unknown to the natives. "Teules" is derived from the Nahuatl word teotl for god but with its meaning changed to representative of god, sometimes implying mysterious and supernatural power.

== Spanish expeditions ==
The Spanish had established a permanent settlement on the island of Hispaniola in 1493 on the second voyage of Christopher Columbus. There were further Spanish explorations and settlements in the Caribbean and the Spanish Main, seeking wealth in the form of gold and access to indigenous labor to mine gold and other manual labor. Twenty-five years after the first Spanish settlement in the New World, expeditions of exploration were sent to the coast of Mexico.

=== Early Spanish expeditions to Yucatán ===
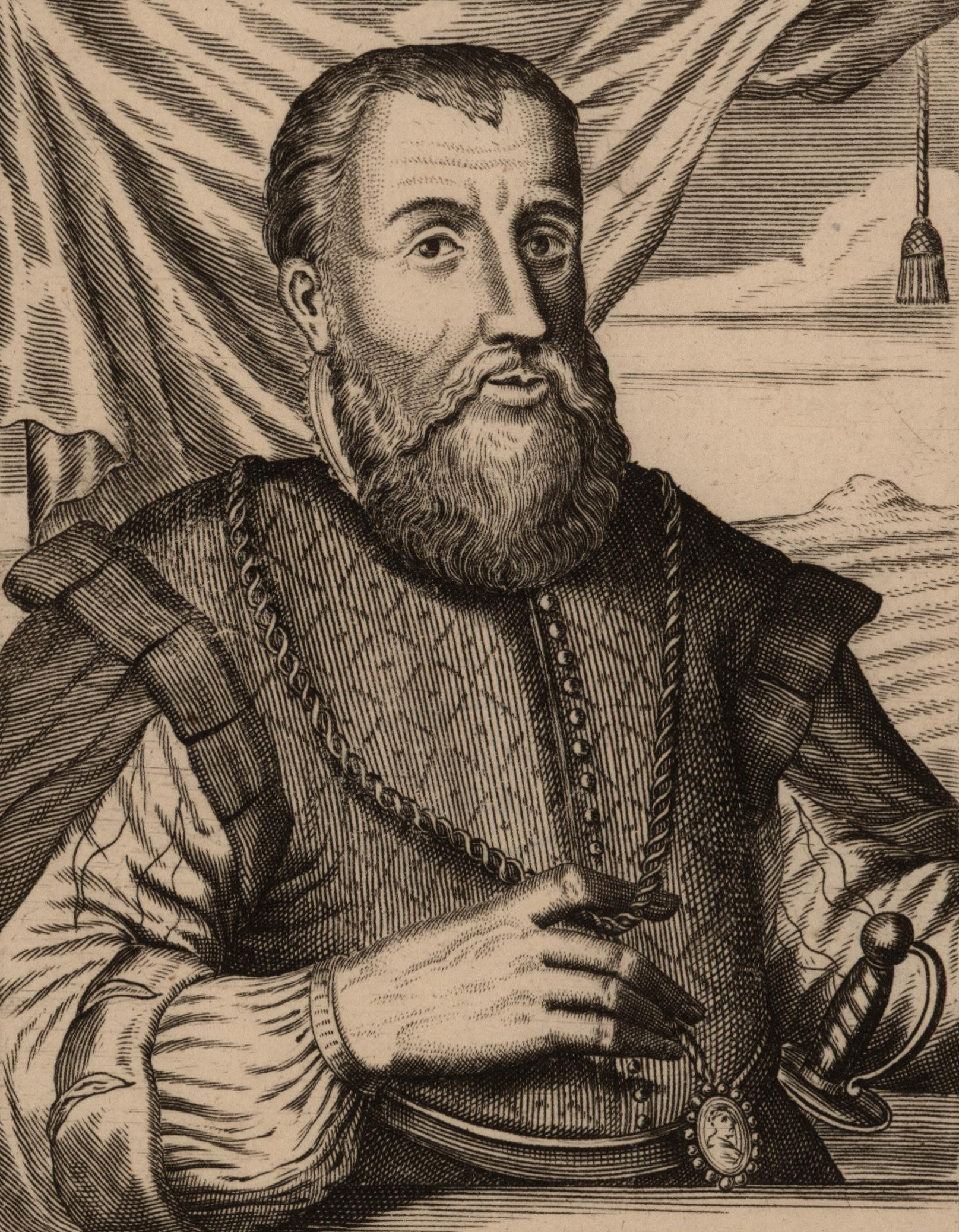
Diego de Velázquez, who commissioned Cortés's limited expedition of exploration in 1519

In 1517, Cuban governor Diego Velázquez commissioned a fleet of three ships under the command of Hernández de Córdoba to sail west and explore the Yucatán peninsula. Córdoba reached the coast of Yucatán. The Mayans at Cape Catoche invited the Spanish to land, and the conquistadors read the Requirement of 1513 to them, which offered the natives the protection of the King of Spain, if they would submit to him. Córdoba took two prisoners, who adopted the baptized names of Melchor and Julián and became interpreters. Later, the two prisoners, being misled or misinterpreting the language gave information to the Spanish conquistadors that there was plenty of gold up for grabs. On the western side of the Yucatán Peninsula, the Spanish were attacked at night by Maya chief Mochcouoh, a battle in which 50 men were killed. Córdoba was mortally wounded and only a remnant of his crew returned to Cuba.

At that time, Yucatán was briefly explored by the conquistadors, but the Spanish conquest of Yucatán with its many independent city-state polities of the Late Postclassic Maya civilization came many years after the Spaniards' and their loyal indigenous allies' rapid conquest of Central Mexico (1519–1521). With the help of tens of thousands of Xiu Mayan warriors, it would take more than 170 years for the Spanish to establish full control of the Maya homelands, which extended from northern Yucatán to the central lowlands region of El Petén and the southern Guatemalan highlands. The end of this latter campaign is generally marked by the downfall of the Maya state based at Tayasal in the Petén region, in 1697.

=== Cortés's expedition ===
==== Commissioning the expedition ====
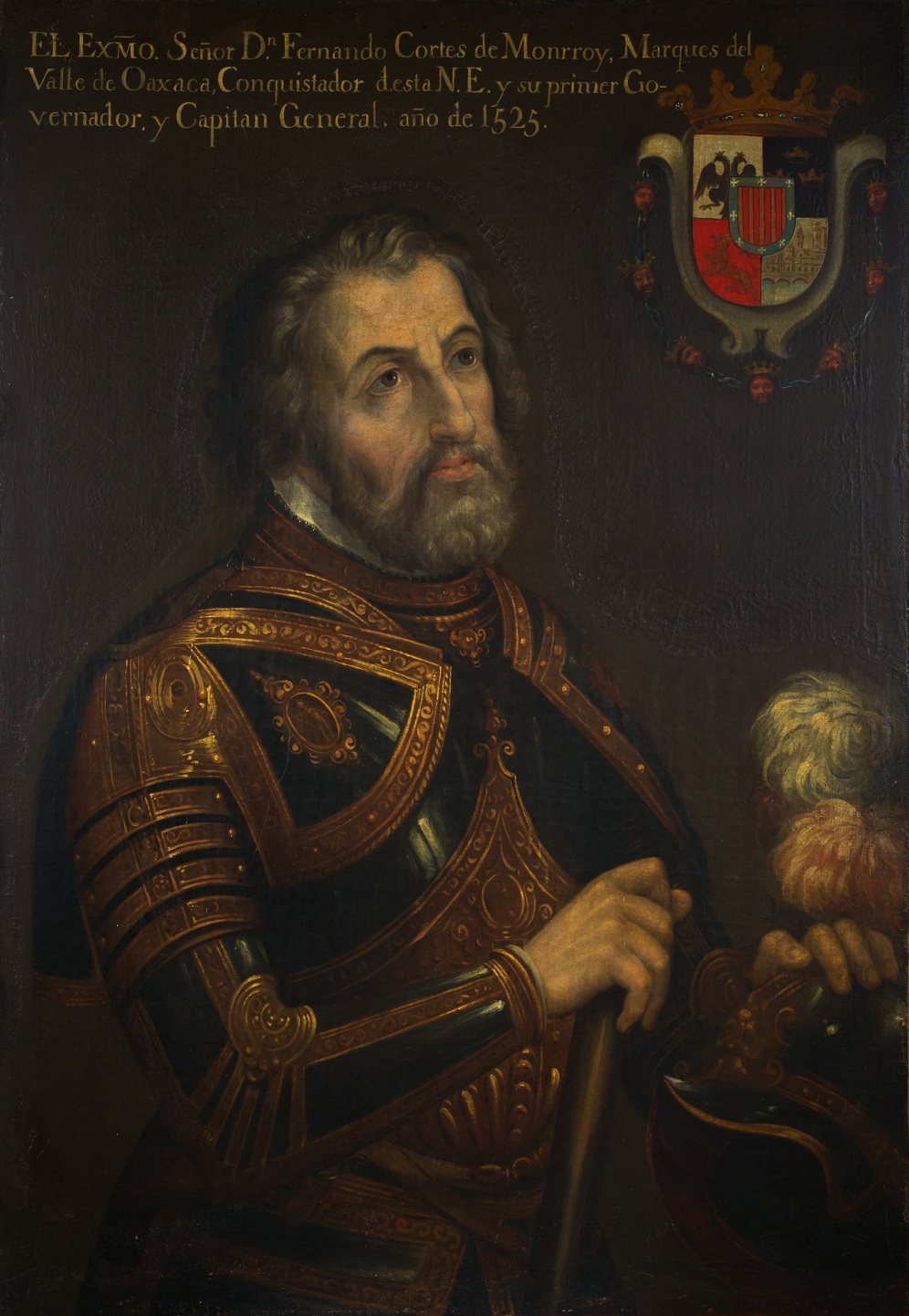
Hernán Cortés in his later years; his coat of arms on the upper right corner (16th century)

Even before Juan de Grijalva returned to Spain, Velázquez decided to send a third and even larger expedition to explore the Mexican coast. Hernán Cortés, then one of Velázquez's favorites and brother-in-law, was named as the commander, which created envy and resentment among the Spanish contingent in the Spanish colony. Licenses for expeditions allowed the Crown to retain sovereignty over newly conquered lands while not risking its own assets in the enterprise. Anyone willing to make a financial contribution could potentially gain even more wealth and power. Men who brought horses, caballeros, received two shares of the spoils, one for military service, another because of the horse. Cortés invested a considerable part of his personal fortune and probably went into debt to borrow additional funds. Velázquez may have personally contributed nearly half the cost of the expedition.

In an agreement signed on 23 October 1518, Governor Velázquez restricted the expedition led by Cortés to exploration and trade, so that conquest and settlement of the mainland might occur under his own command, once he had received the permission necessary to do so which he had already requested from the Crown. In this way, Velázquez sought to ensure title to the riches and laborers discovered. However, armed with the knowledge of Castilian law that he had likely gained as a notary in Valladolid, Cortés managed to free himself of Velázquez's authority by presenting Velázquez as a tyrant acting in his own self-interest, and not in the interest of the Crown. The men under Cortés also named him military leader and chief magistrate (judge) of the expedition.

==== Revoking the commission ====
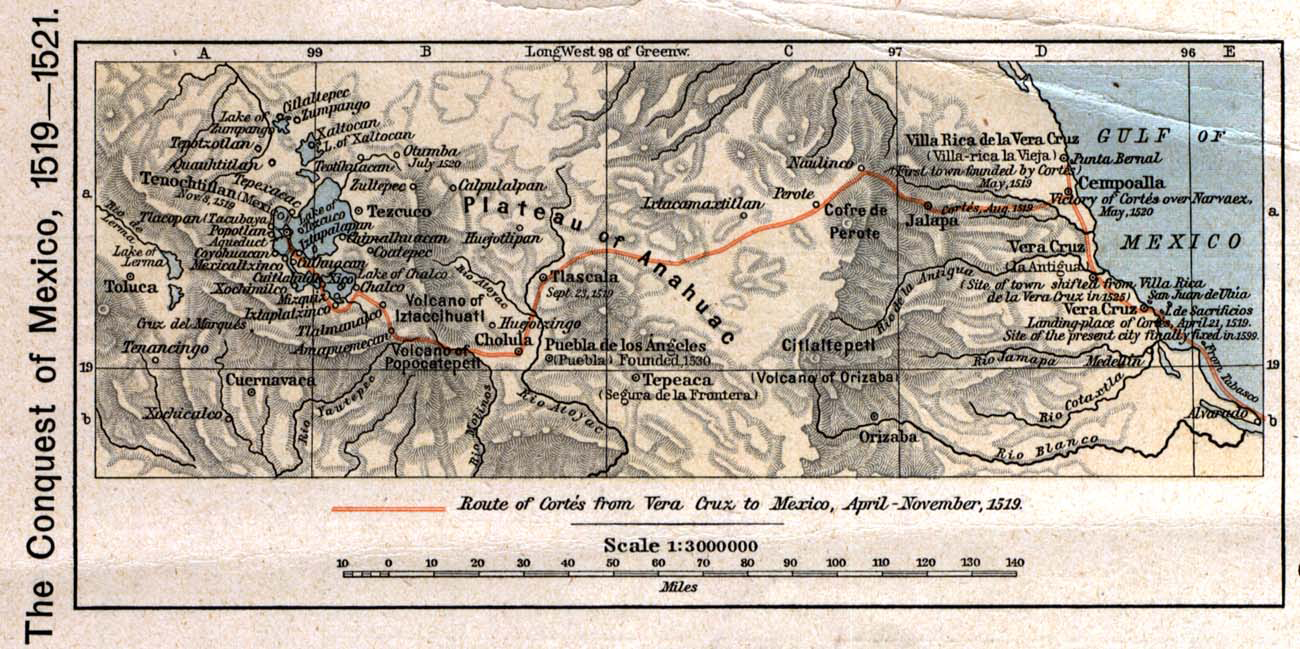
Map depicting Cortés' conquest route

Velázquez himself must have been keenly aware that whoever conquered the mainland for Spain would gain fame, glory and fortune to eclipse anything that could be achieved in Cuba. Thus, as the preparations for departure drew to a close, the governor became suspicious that Cortés would be disloyal to him and try to commandeer the expedition for his own purposes, namely to establish himself as governor of the colony, independent of Velázquez's control.

Velázquez sent Luis de Medina with orders to replace Cortés. However, Cortés's brother-in-law allegedly had Medina intercepted and killed. The papers that Medina had been carrying were sent to Cortés. Thus warned, Cortés accelerated the organization and preparation of his expedition.

Correspondence between the monarchs and the conquistadors was a lengthy process, with the most efficient messages taking at least a year to travel across the ocean. This gave the Spaniards in Mexico relative autonomy because they were often forced to make decisions without the specified consent of the Crown. Cortés took advantage of the ambiguity of local power when he defied Governor Velázquez's orders, later writing directly to the king to defend his actions. In response, Governor Velázquez would send Pánfilo de Narváez to arrest Cortés, as made evident in letters written between Velázquez and Bishop Fonseca in Spain.

Velázquez arrived at the dock in Santiago de Cuba in person, "he and Cortés again embraced, with a great exchange of compliments", before Cortés set sail for Trinidad, Cuba. Velázquez then sent orders for the fleet to be held and Cortés taken prisoner. Nevertheless, Cortés set sail, beginning his expedition with the legal status of a mutineer.

Cortés's contingent consisted of 11 ships carrying about 630 men (including 30 crossbowmen and 12 arquebusiers, an early form of firearm), a doctor, several carpenters, at least eight women, a few hundred Arawaks from Cuba and some Africans, both freedmen and slaves. Although modern usage often calls the European participants "soldiers", the term was never used by these men themselves in any context, something that James Lockhart realized when analyzing sixteenth-century legal records from conquest-era Peru.

==== Cortés gains two translators ====
Cortés spent some time at the island of Cozumel, on the east coast of Yucatán, trying to convert the locals to Christianity, something that provided mixed results. While at Cozumel, Cortés heard reports of other white men living in the Yucatán. Cortés sent messengers to these reported Spaniards, who turned out to be the survivors of a Spanish shipwreck that had occurred in 1511, Gerónimo de Aguilar and Gonzalo Guerrero.

Aguilar petitioned his Maya chieftain to be allowed to join his former countrymen, and he was released and made his way to Cortés's ships. Now quite fluent in Maya, as well as some other indigenous languages, proved to be a valuable asset for Cortés as a translator – a skill of particular significance to the later conquest of the Aztec Empire that was to be the result of Cortés's expedition. According to Bernal Díaz, Aguilar relayed that before coming, he had attempted to convince Guerrero to leave as well. Guerrero declined on the basis that he was by now well-assimilated with the Maya culture, had a Maya wife and three children, and he was looked upon as a figure of rank within the Maya state of Chetumal, where he lived. Although Guerrero's later fate is somewhat uncertain, it appears that for some years he continued to fight alongside the Maya forces against Spanish incursions, providing military counsel and encouraging resistance; it is speculated that he may have been killed in a later battle.

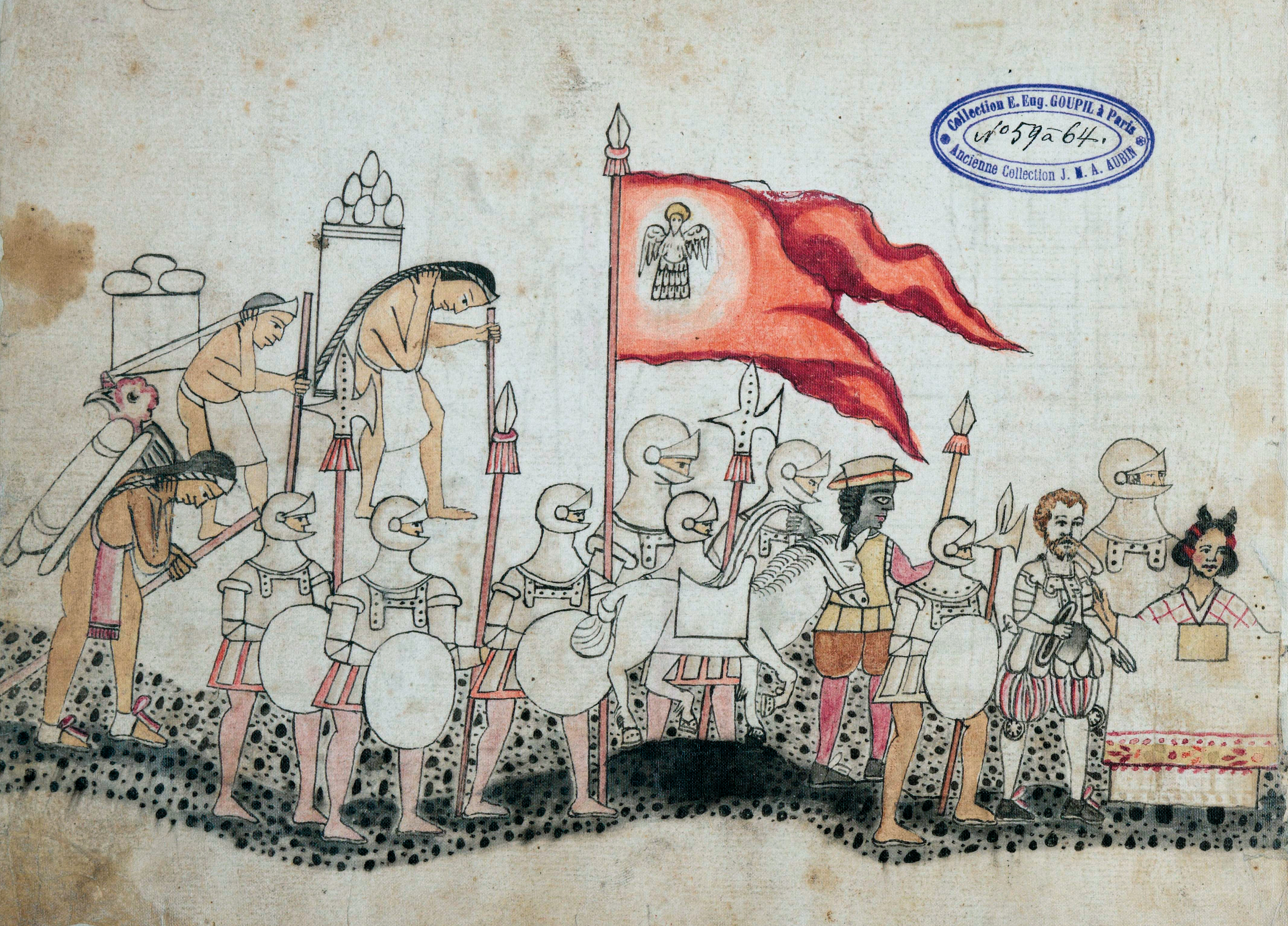
Codex Azcatitlan depicting the Spanish-Tlaxcalan army, with Cortés and La Malinche, along with an African slave in front the meeting with Moctezuma. The facing page is no longer extant.

After leaving Cozumel, Cortés continued round the tip of the Yucatán Peninsula and landed at Potonchán, where there was little gold. After defeating the local natives in two battles, he discovered a far more valuable asset in the form of a woman whom Cortés would have christened Marina. She is often known as La Malinche and also sometimes called "Malintzin" or Malinalli. Later, the Aztecs would come to call Cortés "Malintzin" or La Malinche by dint of his close association with her. Bernal Díaz del Castillo wrote in his account The True History of the Conquest of New Spain that Marina was "truly a great princess". Later, the honorific Spanish title of doña would be added to her baptized name.

Cortés had stumbled upon one of the keys to realizing his ambitions. He would speak to Gerónimo de Aguilar in Spanish who would then translate into Mayan for Marina. She would then translate from Mayan to Nahuatl. With this pair of translators, Cortés could now communicate to the Aztecs. How effectively is still a matter of speculation, since Marina did not speak the dialect of the Aztecs, nor was she familiar with the protocols of the Aztec nobility, who were renowned for their flowery, flattering talk. Doña Marina quickly learned Spanish, and became Cortés's primary interpreter, confidant, consort, cultural translator, and the mother of his first son, Martin. Until Cortés's marriage to his second wife, a union which produced a legitimate son whom he also named Martin, Cortés's natural son with Marina was the heir of his envisaged fortunes.

Native speakers of the Nahuatl community would call her "Malintzin", making her name a part of their own language, trying their best to make it similar to the Spanish "Marina". Over time, "La Malinche" (the modern Spanish cognate of Malintzin) became a term for a traitor to one's people. To this day, the word malinchista is used by Mexicans to denote one who apes the language and customs of another country. It would not be until the late 20th century that a few feminist writers and academics in Mexico would attempt to rehabilitate La Malinche as a woman who made the best of her situation and became, in many respects, a powerful woman.

==== Foundation of Veracruz ====
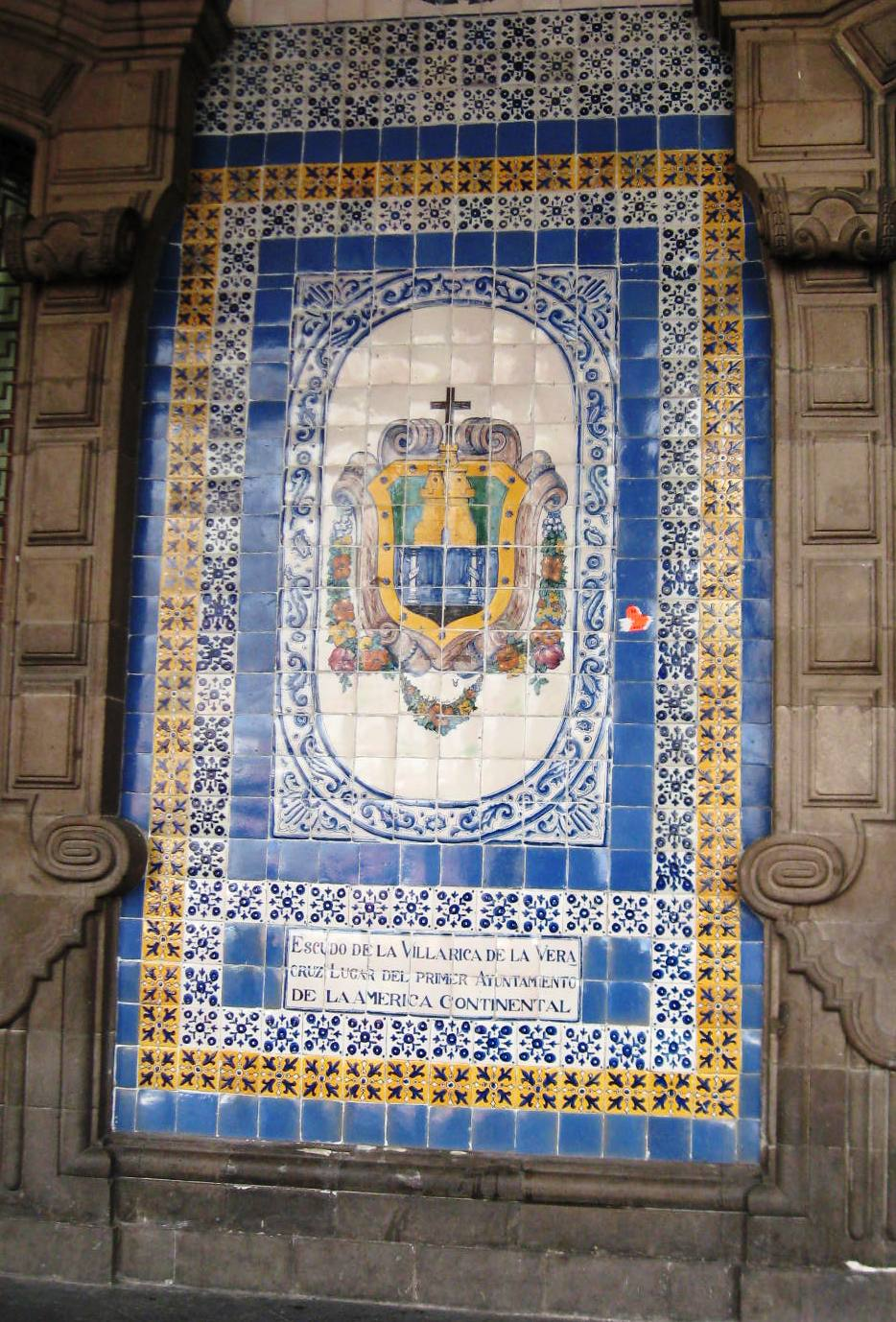
Coat of arms of Villa Rica, Veracruz; the first town council founded by the Spanish. The tile mosaic is located in Mexico City.

Cortés landed his expedition force on the coast of the modern day state of Veracruz in April 1519. During this same period, soon after he arrived, Cortés was welcomed by representatives of the Aztec Emperor, Moctezuma II. Gifts were exchanged, and Cortés attempted to frighten the Aztec delegation with a display of his firepower.

It is speculated that Cortés faced imprisonment or death for defying the governor. This was a potential motivation for his migration and the establishment of Vera Cruz. The settlement was named La Villa Rica de la Vera Cruz, or "Rich Town of the True Cross", in honor of Holy Week: the Spaniards arrived on Maundy Thursday and landed on Good Friday. The legally constituted "town council of Villa Rica" then promptly offered Cortés the position of adelantado, or Chief Justice and Captain-General.

This strategy was not unique. Velázquez had used this same legal mechanism to free himself from Diego Columbus' authority in Cuba. In being named adelantado by a duly constituted cabildo, Cortés was able to free himself from Velázquez's authority and continue his expedition. To ensure the legality of this action, several members of his expedition, including Francisco Montejo and Alonso Hernandez Puertocarrero, returned to Spain to seek acceptance of the cabildo's declaration with King Charles.

Cortés learned of an indigenous settlement called Cempoala and marched his forces there. On their arrival in Cempoala, they were greeted by 20 dignitaries and cheering townsfolk. Cortés quickly persuaded the Totonac chiefs to rebel against the Aztecs, taking prisoner five of Moctezuma's tax collectors. The Totonacs also helped Cortés build the town of Villa Rica de la Vera Cruz, which was the starting point for his attempt to conquer the Aztec Empire.

Hearing of the rebellion, more ambassadors from the Aztec Emperor returned to see Cortés, bearing gifts of "gold and cloth" in thankfulness for Cortés freeing his tax collectors. Moctezuma also told Cortés he was certain the Spanish were of "his own race" and had arrived as "his ancestors had foretold." Cortés then told his men, the natives "think of us as gods, or godlike beings." This interpretation was later accepted by historians, although recent scholars, such as Camilla Townsend, suggest that the perception by Natives that the Spanish were "godlike" was a fallacy made up by the Spaniards.

Although Moctezuma's ambassadors attempted to dissuade Cortés from visiting Tenochtitlan, their lavish gifts and polite, welcoming remarks only encouraged El Caudillo to continue his march towards the imperial capital.

==== Scuttling the fleet and aftermath ====
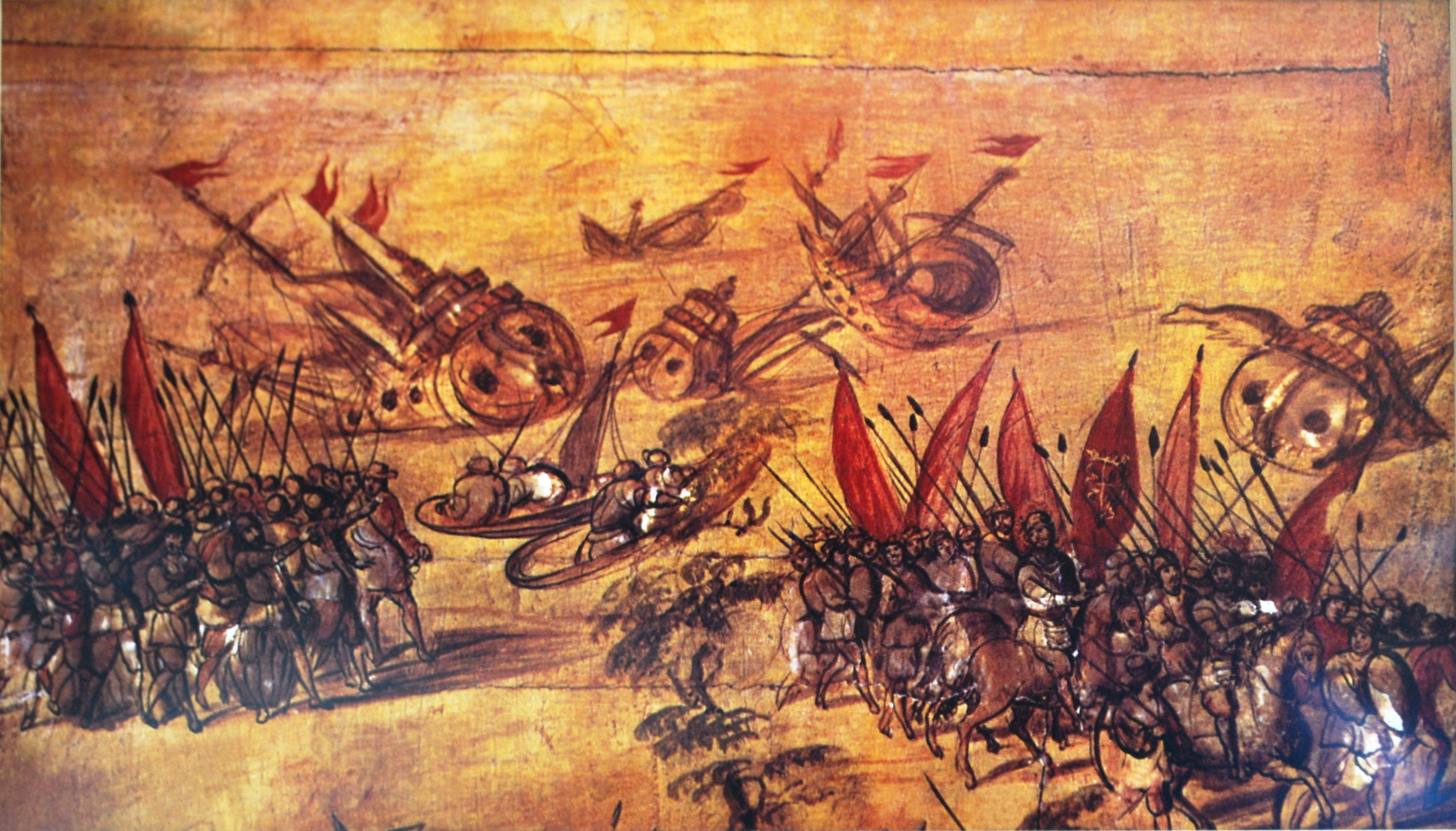
Cortés scuttling fleet off Veracruz coast

While in Vera Cruz, men still loyal to the governor of Cuba planned to seize a ship and escape to Cuba, but Cortés moved swiftly to squash their plans. Two leaders were condemned to be hanged; two were lashed, and one had his foot mutilated. To make sure such a mutiny did not happen again, he decided to scuttle his ships.

There is a popular misconception that the ships were burned rather than sunk. This misconception has been attributed to the reference made by Cervantes de Salazár in 1546, as to Cortés burning his ships. This may have also come from a mistranslation of the version of the story written in Latin.

With all of his ships scuttled, Cortés effectively stranded the expedition in central Mexico. Additionally, this was done in an effort to eliminate any possible chance to retreat, forcing Cortés' men to commit to further explore inland. However, it did not completely end the aspirations of those members of his company who remained loyal to the governor of Cuba. Cortés then led his band inland towards Tenochtitlan.

In addition to the Spaniards, Cortés' force now included 40 Cempoalan warrior chiefs and at least 200 other natives whose task was to drag the cannon and carry supplies. The Cempoalans were accustomed to the hot climate of the coast, but they suffered immensely from the cold of the mountains, the rain, and the hail as they marched towards Tenochtitlan.

==== Alliance with Tlaxcala ====
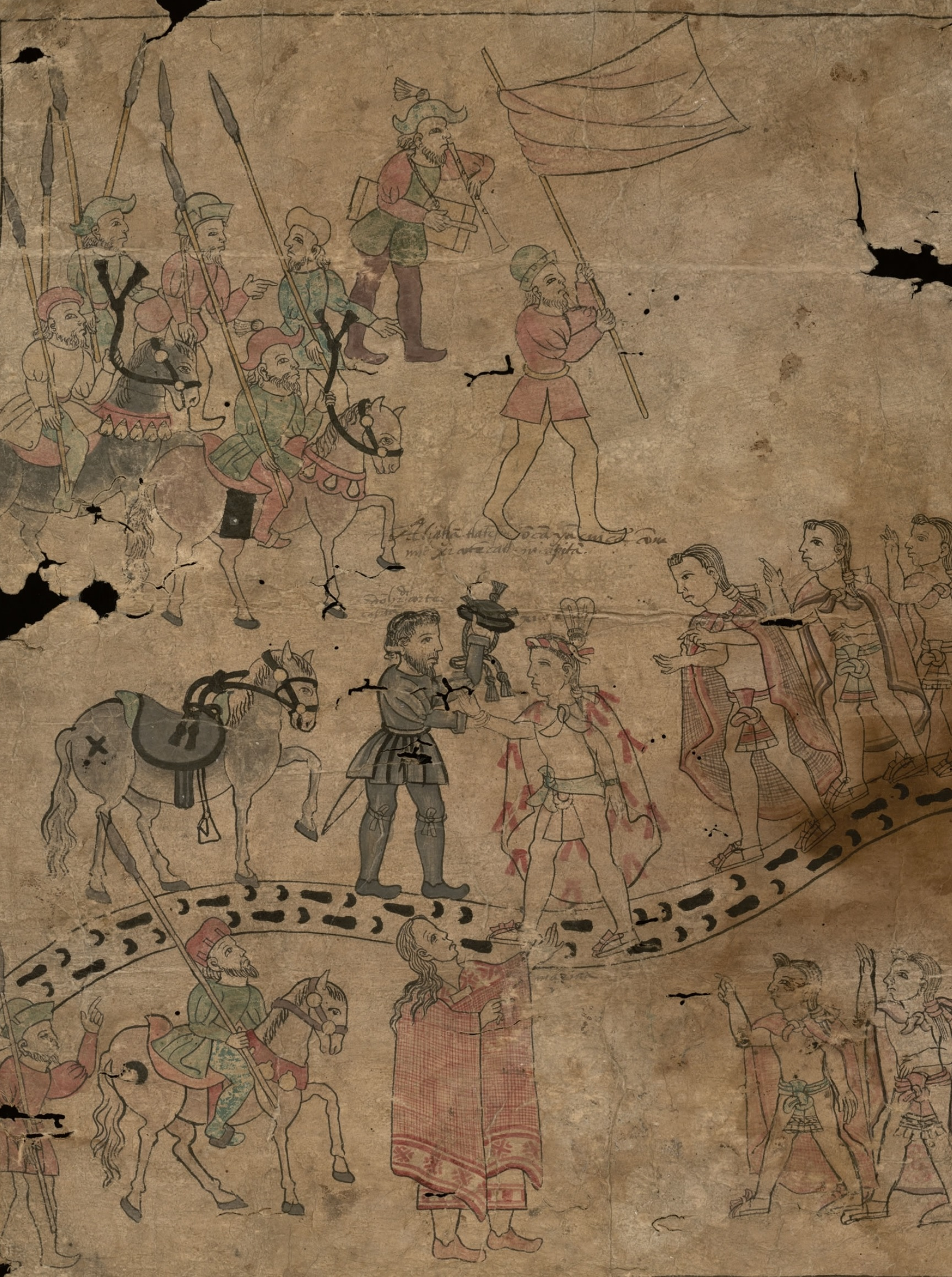
Meeting of Cortés and Xicotencatl

Cortés soon arrived at Tlaxcala, a confederacy of about 200 towns and different tribes, but without central government.

The Otomi initially, and then the Tlaxcalans, fought the Spanish in a series of three battles from 2 to 5 September 1519, and at one point Diaz remarked, "they surrounded us on every side". After Cortés continued to release prisoners with messages of peace, and realizing the Spanish were enemies of Moctezuma, Xicotencatl the Elder and Maxixcatzin persuaded the Tlaxcalan warleader, Xicotencatl the Younger, that it would be better to ally with the newcomers than to kill them.

The Tlaxcalans' main city was Tlaxcala. After almost a century of fighting the Flower Wars, a great deal of hatred and bitterness had developed between the Tlaxcalans and the Aztecs. The Aztecs had already conquered most of the territory around Tlaxcala, and waged war on them every year. It has been suggested that the Aztecs left Tlaxcala independent so that they would have a constant supply of war captives to sacrifice to their gods.

On 23 September 1519, Cortés arrived in Tlaxcala and was greeted with joy by the rulers, who saw the Spanish as an ally against the Aztecs. Due to a commercial blockade by the Aztecs, Tlaxcala was poor, lacking, among other things, salt and cotton cloths, so they could only offer Cortés and his men food and slaves. Cortés stayed twenty days in Tlaxcala, giving his men time to recover from their wounds from the battles. Cortés seems to have won the true friendship and loyalty of the senior leaders of Tlaxcala, among them Maxixcatzin and Xicotencatl the Elder, although he could not win the heart of Xicotencatl the Younger. The Spaniards agreed to respect parts of the city, like the temples, and reportedly took only the things that were offered to them freely.

As before with other native groups, Cortés preached to the Tlaxcalan leaders about the benefits of Christianity. The Caciques gave Cortés "the most beautiful of their daughters and nieces". Xicotencatl the Elder's daughter was baptized as Doña Luisa, and Maxixcatzin's daughter as Doña Elvira. They were given by Cortés to Pedro de Alvarado and Juan Velázquez de León respectively.

Legends say that he convinced the four leaders of Tlaxcala to become baptized. Maxixcatzin, Xicotencatl the Elder, Citalpopocatzin, and Temiloltecutl received the names of Don Lorenzo, Don Vicente, Don Bartolomé, and Don Gonzalo. It is impossible to know if these leaders understood the Catholic faith. In any case, they apparently had no problems in adding the Christian "Dios" (God in Spanish), the lord of the heavens, to their already complex pantheon of gods. An exchange of gifts was made and thus began the highly significant and effective alliance between Cortés and Tlaxcala.

==== Cortés marches to Cholula ====
Meanwhile, Moctezuma's ambassadors, who had been in the Spanish camp after the battles with the Tlaxcalans, continued to press Cortés to take the road to Mexico via Cholula, which was under Aztec control, rather than over Huexotzinco, which was an ally of Tlaxcala. They were surprised Cortés had stayed in Tlaxcala so long "among a poor and ill-bred people".

Cholula was one of the most important cities of Mesoamerica, the second largest, and probably the most sacred. Its huge pyramid (larger in volume than the great pyramids of Egypt) made it one of the most prestigious places of the Aztec religion. However, it appears that Cortés perceived Cholula more as a military threat to his rear guard than a religious center, as he marched to Tenochtitlan. He sent emissaries ahead to try a diplomatic solution to enter the city.

Cortés, who had not yet decided to start a war with the Aztec Empire, decided to offer a compromise. He accepted the gifts of the Aztec ambassadors, and at the same time accepted the offer of the Tlaxcalan allies to provide porters and 1,000 warriors on his march to Cholula. He also sent two men, Pedro de Alvarado and Bernardino Vázquez de Tapia, directly to Tenochtitlan, as ambassadors and to scout for an appropriate route.

==== Massacre of Cholula ====
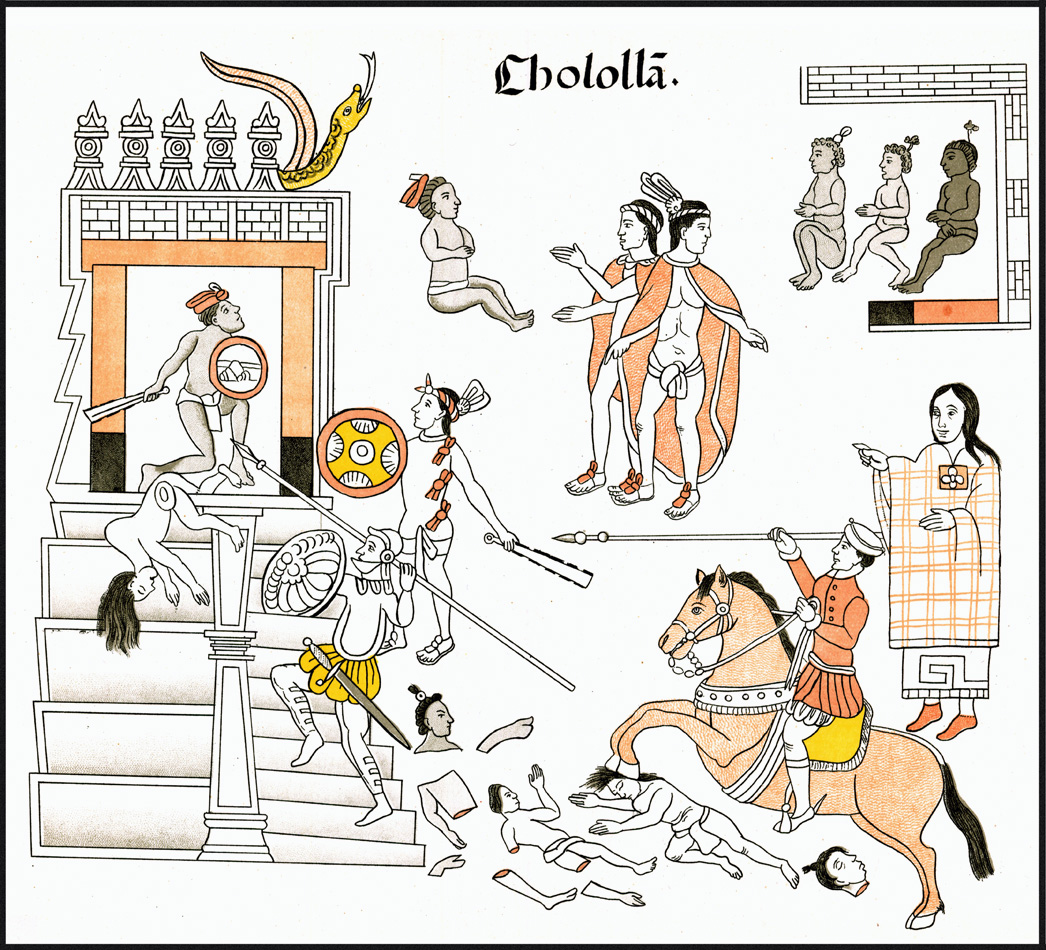
The massacre of Cholula. Lienzo de Tlaxcala

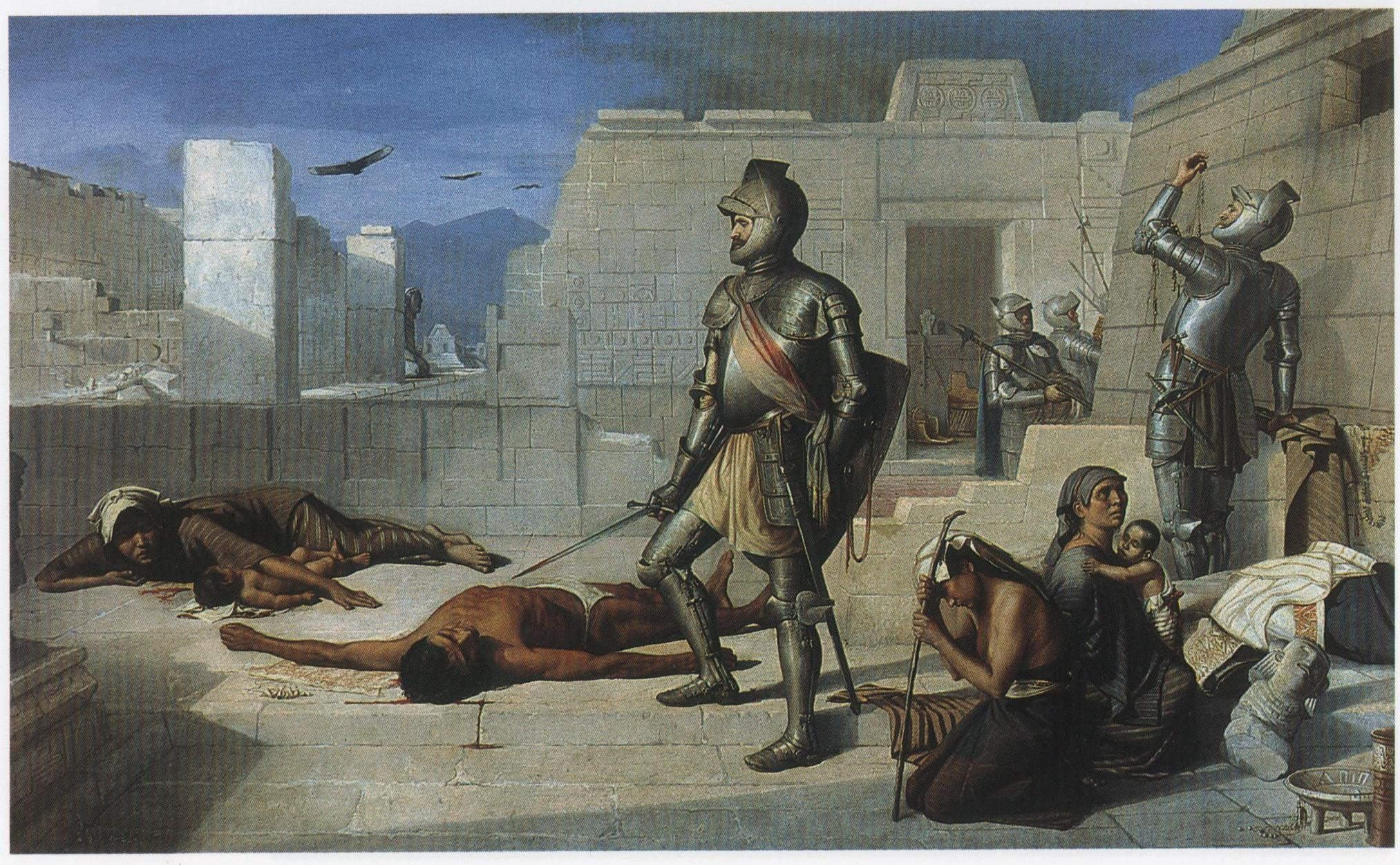
Cholula Massacre, by Felix Parra, 1877

The attack on Cholula is one of the most documented events in the history of Spanish conquest. Over ten accounts have been preserved, including, most famously, Indigenous illustrations, letters by Cortés, and a memoir written by the soldier Bernal Díaz del Castillo. The accounts provide contradictory reports about what occurred at Cholula, including what incited the Spaniards' massacre of thousands of Natives. Cortés, in his letter to King Charles, claimed that he had found evidence that the Cholulans had planned to ambush the Spaniards. According to Bernal Díaz, Moctezuma had ordered the leaders of Cholula to try to stop the Spanish. Tlaxcalan sources claim that the Tlaxcalan ambassador, Patlahuatzin, was sent to Cholula and had been tortured by the Cholulans. Thus, Cortés was avenging him by attacking Cholula.(Historia de Tlaxcala, por Diego Muñoz Camargo, lib. II cap. V. 1550). The Mexica version puts the blame on the Tlaxcalans, claiming that they resented Cortés going to Cholula instead of Huexotzingo. Instead of the revenge narrative depicted by Díaz, Mexica chroniclers portray the Tlaxcalans as manipulative, having persuaded the Spaniards to target Cholula for their own political reasons.^{: 40}

Although one of the largest cities in Mexico, Cholula had a very small army due to its function as a sacred city. Cholulan leaders relied on protection from the city's prestige and their gods. As seen in the chronicles of the Tlaxcalteca, the priests of Cholula expected to use the power of Quetzalcoatl, their primary god, against the invaders.

According to Spanish accounts, Cortés and his men entered Cholula without active resistance. However, they were not met by the city leaders and were not given food and drink on the third day. Cempoalans reported that fortifications were being constructed around the city and the Tlaxcalans were warning the Spaniards. Finally, La Malinche informed Cortés, after talking to the wife of one of the lords of Cholula, that the locals planned to murder the Spanish in their sleep. Although he did not know if the rumor was true or not, Cortés ordered a pre-emptive strike, urged by the Tlaxcalans, the enemies of the Cholulans. Cortés confronted the city leaders in the main temple alleging that they were planning to attack his men. They admitted that they had been ordered to resist by Moctezuma, but they claimed they had not followed his orders. Regardless, on command, the Spaniards seized and killed many of the local nobles to serve as a lesson.

The Spanish, in their own telling, captured the Cholulan leaders Tlaquiach and Tlalchiac and then ordered the city to be set on fire. The troops started in the palace of Xacayatzin, and then on to Chialinco and Yetzcoloc. In letters to his King, Cortés claimed that in three hours time his troops (helped by the Tlaxcalans) killed 3,000 people and had burned the city. Another witness, Vázquez de Tapia, claimed the death toll was as high as 30,000. However, since the women and children, and many men, had already fled the city, it is unlikely that so many were killed. Regardless, the massacre of the nobility of Cholula was a notorious chapter in the conquest of Mexico.

The massacre had a chilling effect on the other city states and groups affiliated with the Aztecs, as well as the Aztecs themselves. Tales of the massacre convinced the other cities in the Aztec Empire to entertain seriously Cortés' proposals rather than risk the same fate.

After the massacre, Cortés sent emissaries to Moctezuma with the message that the people of Cholula had treated him with trickery and had therefore been punished.According to Spanish sources, Moctezuma blamed the commanders of the local Aztec garrison for the resistance in Cholula. Recognizing that his long-standing attempts to dissuade Cortés from coming to Tenochtitlan had failed and that nothing else could be done, Moctezuma finally invited the conquistadors to visit his capital city.

==== Entry into Tenochtitlan ====
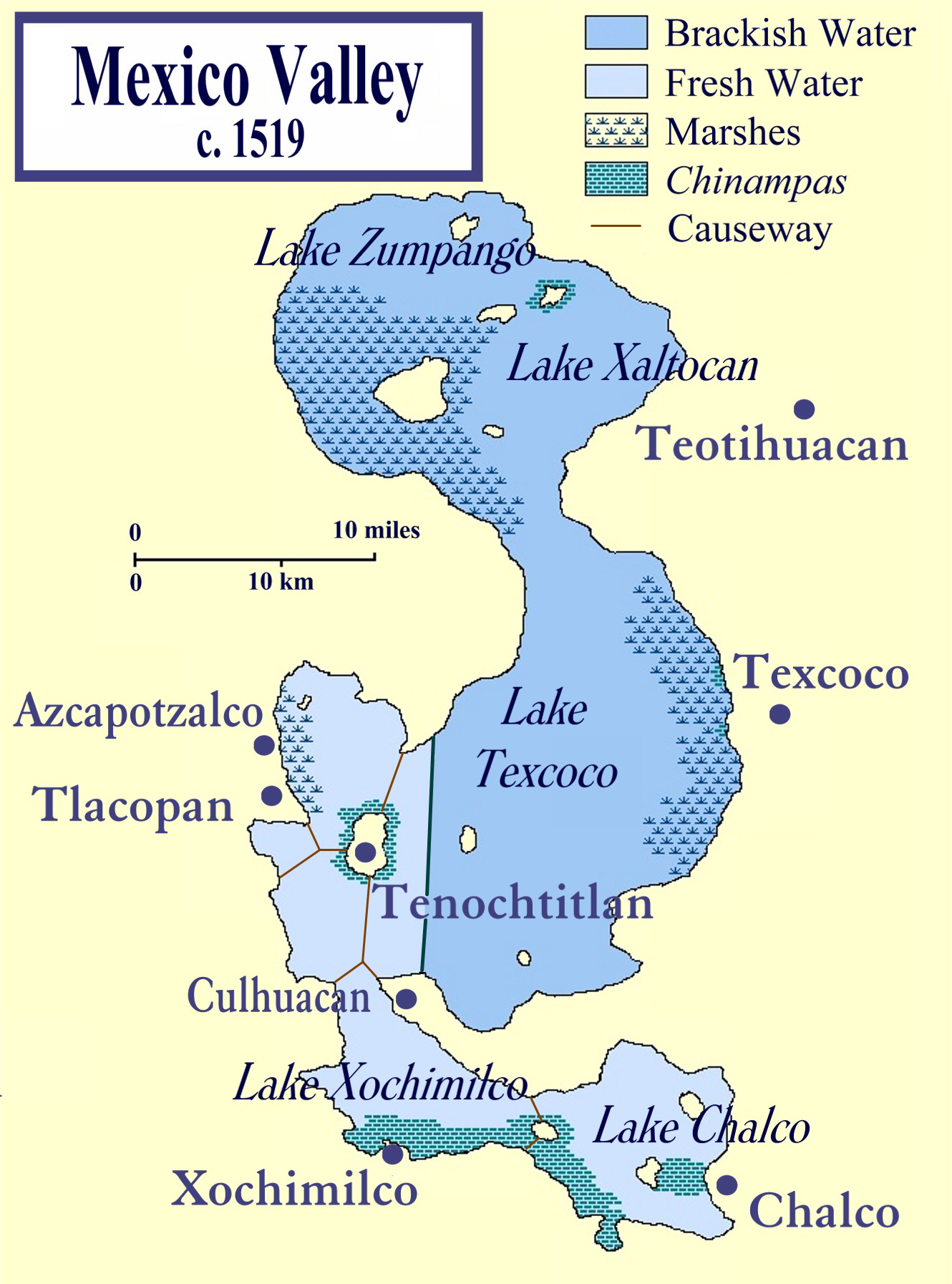
Map of the Valley of Mexico on the eve of the Spanish conquest

On 8 November 1519, after the fall of Cholula, Cortés and his forces entered Tenochtitlan, the island capital of the Mexica-Aztecs. It is believed that the city was one of the largest in the world at that time, and the largest in the Americas up to that point. The most common estimates put the population at around 60,000 to over 300,000 people. If the population of Tenochtitlan was 250,000 in 1519, then Tenochtitlan would have been larger than every city in Europe (the two largest cities in Europe, Paris and Naples, had 225,000 and 125,000 inhabitants respectively in the early 16th century), and more than five times the size of Seville (45,000 inhabitants in the early 16th century).

To the Aztecs, Tenochtitlan was the "altar" for the Empire, as well as being the city that Quetzalcoatl would eventually return to.

==== Cortés welcomed by Moctezuma ====
Upon meeting, Hernan Cortés claimed to be the representative of the queen, Doña Juana of Castile, and her son Holy Roman Emperor Charles V. Sahagún reports that Moctezuma welcomed Cortés to Tenochtitlan on the Great Causeway, Xolac. "The chiefs who accompanied Moctezuma were: Cacamatzin, king of Tetzcoco; Tetlepanquetzaltin, king of Tlacopan, Itzcuauhtzin the Tlacochcalcatl, lord of Tlatelolco; and Topantemoc, Motechzoma's treasurer in Tlatelolco." Moctezuma and his chiefs were adorned with blazing gold on their shoulders with feathers and jewels. On the causeway where the two groups met, enormous numbers of people from Tenochtitlan watched the exchange.

Moctezuma went to greet Cortés with his brother, Cuitláhuac, and his nephew, Cacamatzin. Cortés strode ahead of his commanders and attempted to embrace Moctezuma, but was restrained by Cuitlahuac and Cacamatzin. Cortés was not permitted to touch the emperor; no one was allowed.

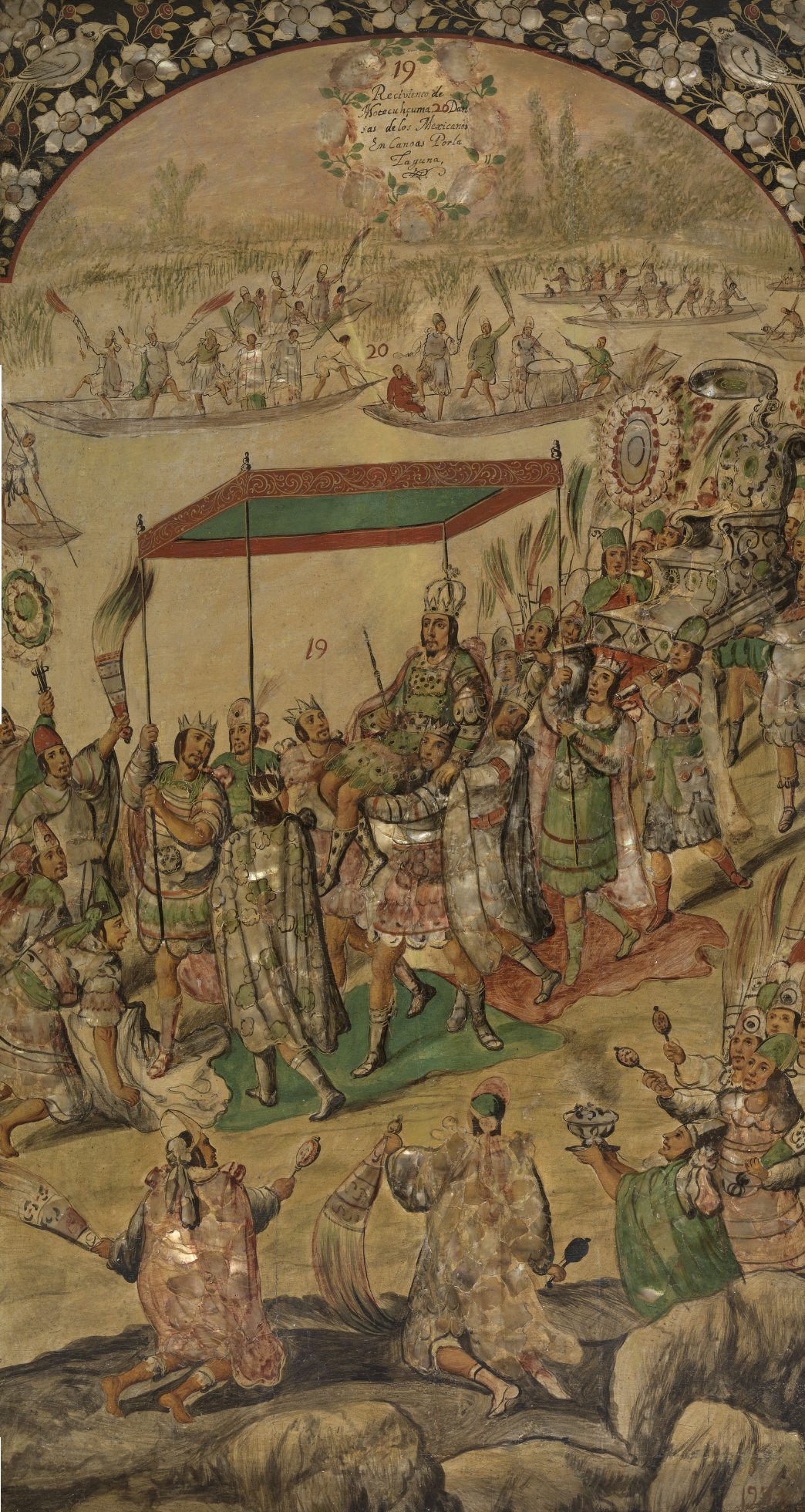
"Motecuhzuma receives Cortés. Mexican dances in the lake." by Juan González and Miguel González. 1698

After greetings, Moctezuma personally dressed only Cortés in a priceless feather-work flower, a golden jewelry studded necklace and a garland of flowers. Moctezuma then brought Cortés to the shrine of the goddess Toci, where he gave him a more private greeting, in which he practically gave the Aztec Empire to Cortés, as he reportedly said that it was his "desire to serve".

A fragment of the greetings of Moctezuma says: "My lord, you have become fatigued, you have become tired: to the land you have arrived. You have come to your city: Mexico, here you have come to sit on your place, on your throne. Oh, it has been reserved to you for a small time, it was conserved by those who have gone, your substitutes ... This is what has been told by our rulers, those of whom governed this city, ruled this city. That you would come to ask for your throne, your place, that you would come here. Come to the land, come and rest: take possession of your royal houses, give food to your body."

Moctezuma had the royal palace of Axayácatl, Moctezuma's father, prepared for Cortés. On the same day that the Spanish expedition and their allies entered Tenochtitlan, Moctezuma came to visit Cortés and his men. What happened in this second meeting remains controversial. According to several Spanish versions, some written years or decades later, Moctezuma first repeated his earlier, flowery welcome to Cortés on the Great Causeway, but then went on to explain his view of what the Spanish expedition represented in terms of Aztec tradition and lore, including the idea that Cortés and his men (pale, bearded men from the east) were the return of characters from Aztec legend. At the end of this explanation, the Emperor pledged his loyalty to the King of Spain and accepted Cortés as the King's representative. According to Diaz, Moctezuma said to Cortés, "As for your great King, I am in his debt and will give him of what I possess."

While in the Axayacatl palace, the conquistadors discovered the secret room where Moctezuma kept the treasure he had inherited from his father. The treasure consisted of a "quantity of golden objects – jewels and plates and ingots". Diaz noted, "The sight of all that wealth dumbfounded me."

Cortés later asked Moctezuma to allow him to erect a cross and an image of Virgin Mary next to the two large idols of Huichilobos and Tezcatlipoca, after climbing the one hundred and fourteen steps to the top of the main temple pyramid, a central place for religious authority. Moctezuma and his papas were furious at the suggestion, with Moctezuma claiming his idols, "give us health and rain and crops and weather, and all the victories we desire."

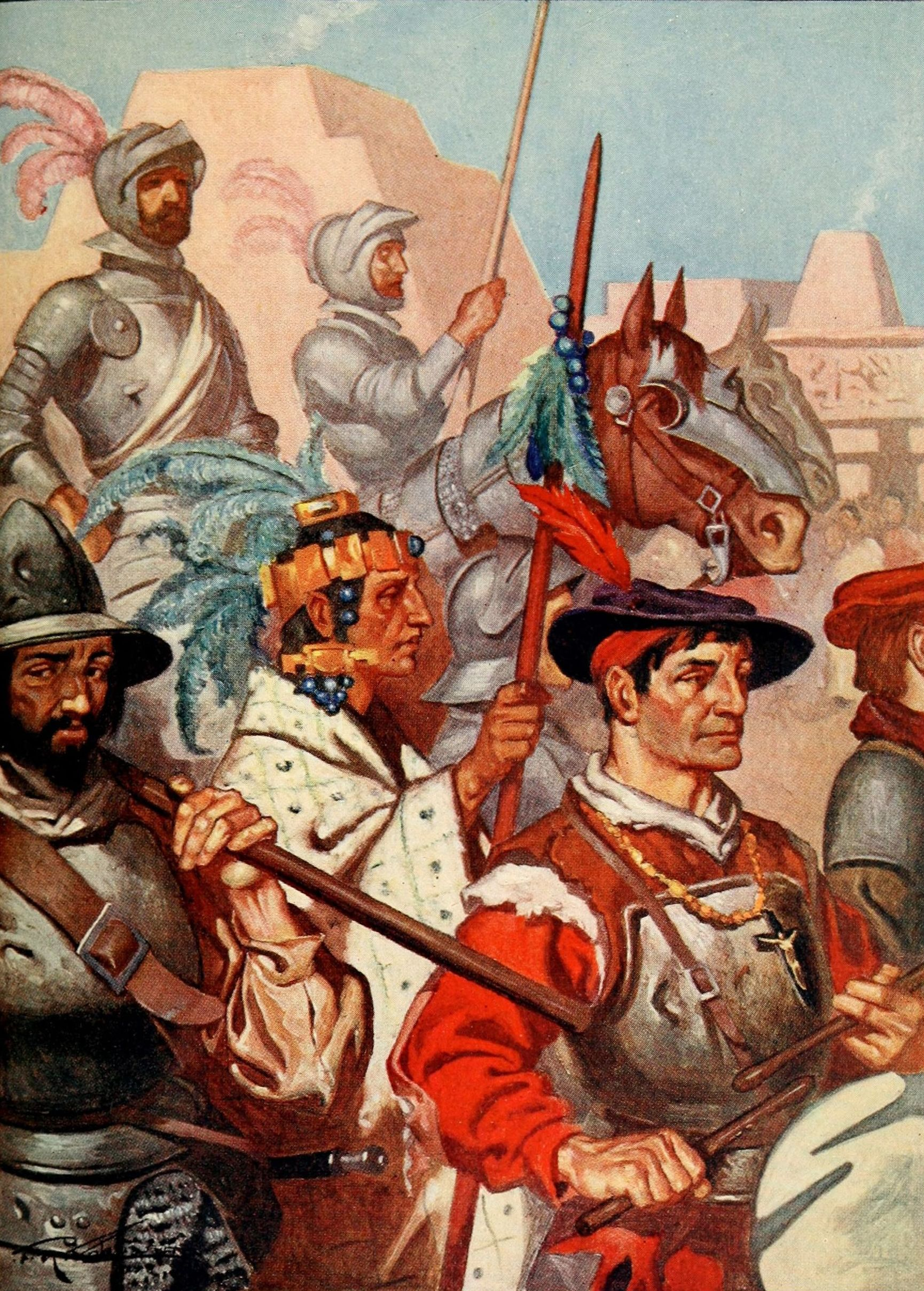
Conquistadors and their Tlaxcalan allies enter Tenochtitlan.

After Cortés' request surrounding the questioning of raising the cross and the image of the Virgin Mary, the Mexica then killed seven Spanish soldiers Cortés had left on the coast, including Cortés' Villa Rica Constable Juan de Escalante, and many Totonacs. Cortés along with five of his captains and Doña Marina and Aguilar, convinced Moctezuma to "come quietly with us to our quarters, and make no protest ... if you cry out, or raise any commotion, you will immediately be killed." Moctezuma was later implicated by Qualpopoca and his captains, who had killed the Spanish soldiers. Though these captains of Moctezuma were sentenced to be "burned to death", Moctezuma continued to remain a prisoner, fearing a "rebellion in his city" or that the Spanish may "try to set up another prince in his place". This, despite Moctezuma's chieftains, nephews and relations suggesting they should attack the Spanish.

As of 14 November 1519, Moctezuma was Cortés' prisoner as insurance against any further resistance, until the end of May 1520, Moctezuma lived with Cortés in the palace of Axayácatl.

However, Moctezuma continued to act as Emperor, subject to Cortés' overall control. During the period of his imprisonment, Moctezuma stated "he was glad to be a prisoner, since either our gods gave us power to confine him or Huichilobos permitted it." He would even play the game of totoloque with Cortés. After the treason of Cacamatzin, Moctezuma and his caciques, were forced to take a more formal oath of allegiance to the King of Spain, though Moctezuma "could not restrain his tears". Moctezuma told his caciques that "their ancestral tradition, set down in their books of records, that men would come from the direction of the sunrise to rule these lands" and that "He believed ... we were these men."

Cortés sent expeditions to investigate the Aztec sources of gold in the provinces of Zacatula, Tuxtepec, and the land of the Chinantec. Moctezuma was then made to pay a tribute to the Spanish King, which included his father's treasure. These treasures, the Spaniards melted down to form gold bars stamped with an iron die. Finally, Moctezuma let the Catholic conquistadors build an altar on their temple, next to the Aztec idols.

Finally, the Aztec gods allegedly told the Mexican papas, or priests, they would not stay unless the Spaniards were killed and driven back across the sea. Moctezuma warned Cortés to leave at once, as their lives were at risk. Many of the nobility rallied around Cuitláhuac, the brother of Moctezuma and his heir-apparent; however, most of them could take no overt action against the Spanish unless the order was given by the Emperor.

==== Defeat of Narváez ====
In April 1520, Cortés was told by Moctezuma that a much larger party of Spanish troops had arrived, consisting of nineteen ships and fourteen hundred soldiers under the command of Pánfilo de Narváez. Narváez had been sent by Governor Velázquez from Cuba to kill or capture Cortés, who had defied Velazquez's orders.

Leaving his "least reliable soldiers" under the command of the headstrong Pedro de Alvarado to guard Moctezuma, Cortés set out against Narváez, who had advanced onto Cempoala. Cortés surprised his antagonist with a night attack, during which his men wounded Narváez in the eye and took him prisoner. After Cortés permitted the defeated soldiers to settle in the country, they "passed with more or less willingness to Cortés' side." Hernán Cortés gained their support when he "promised to make them rich and give them commands [rewards]." Cortés then made a rapid return to Tenochtitlan to relieve the besieged Alvarado and the other invaders.

Cortés led his combined forces on an arduous trek back over the Sierra Madre Oriental, returning to Mexico on St. John's Day June 1520, with 1,300 soldiers and 96 horses, plus 2,000 Tlaxcalan warriors.

==== Aztec response ====
When Cortés returned to Tenochtitlan in late May, he found that Alvarado and his men had attacked and killed many of the Aztec nobility in the Massacre in the Great Temple, that happened during a religious festival organized by the Aztecs. The Great Temple was central to the Aztecs' cosmological views; the temple served as a burial ground for the offerings made to different gods, such as the gods of fertility, mountains, rain, and earth. Considering the centrality and the importance of the Great Temple as a religious and cultural monument could potentially have influenced the decision to attack a location such as this. Alvarado's explanation to Cortés was that the Spaniards had learned that the Aztecs planned to attack the Spanish garrison in the city once the festival was complete, so he had launched a preemptive attack.

==== Spanish retreat from Tenochtitlan ====
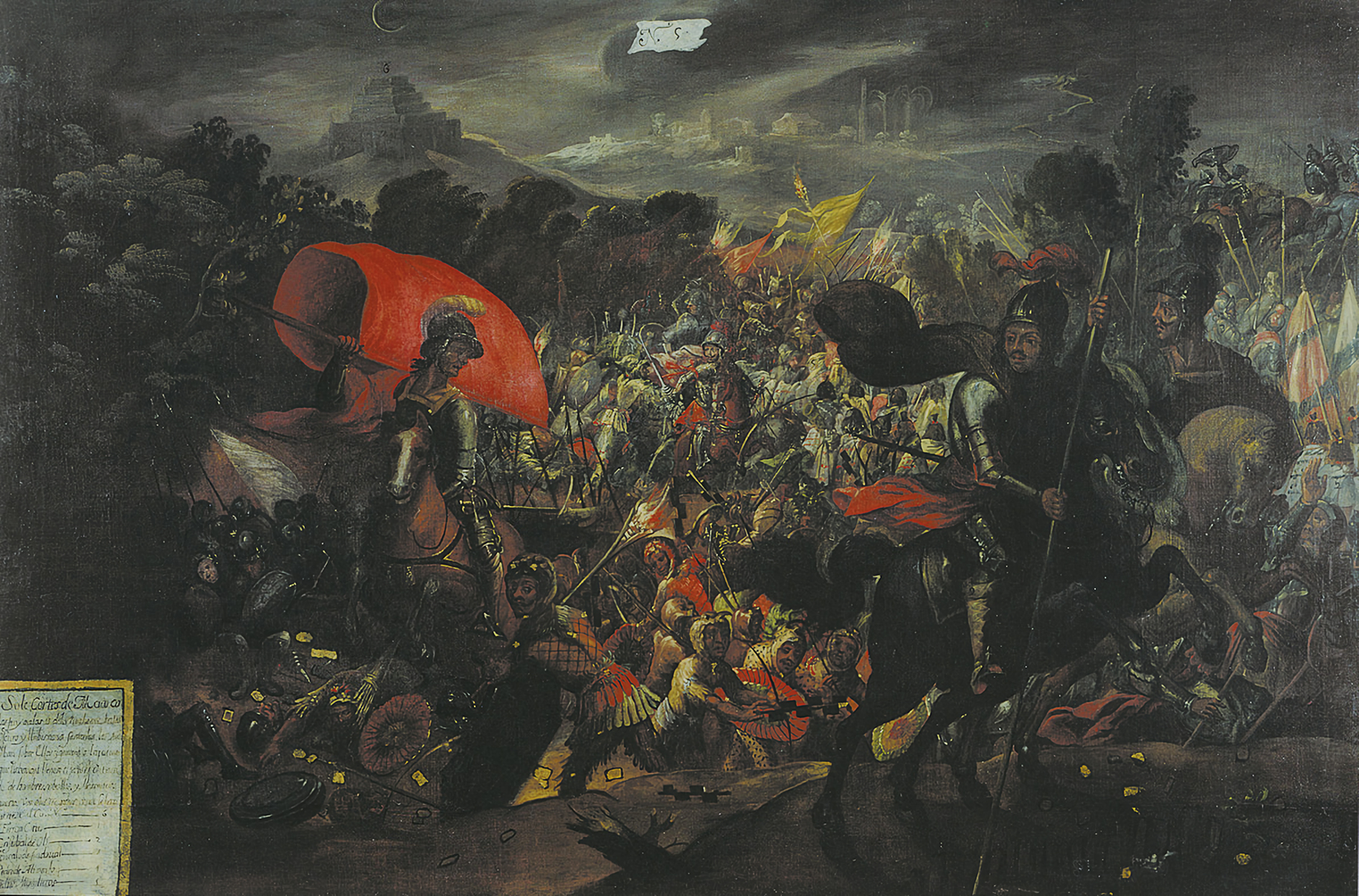
La Noche Triste depicted in the 17th century

In any event, the population of the city rose en masse after the Spanish attack, which the Spanish did not expect. Fierce fighting ensued, and the Aztec troops besieged the palace housing the Spaniards and Moctezuma. Alvarado and the rest of the Spanish were held hostage by the Aztecs for a month. The nobility of Tenochtitlan chose Cuitláhuac as Huey Tlatoani (Emperor). Cortés ordered Moctezuma to speak to his people from a palace balcony and persuade them to let the Spanish return to the coast in peace. Moctezuma was jeered and stones were thrown at him, mortally wounding him. Aztec sources state the Spaniards killed him.

Cortés had formed an alliance with Tlaxcala. This alliance had many victories, including the overtaking of the Aztec Capital Tenochtitlan. Their capital was used as a cosmic center, where they fed sacrifices to the gods through both human bodies and bloodletting. The capital was also used for central and imperialistic governmental control. Preparations for war began in their capital. The Spanish and their allies, including the Tlaxcala, had to flee the central city, as the people of Tenochtitlan had risen against them. The Spaniards' situation could only deteriorate. Because the Aztecs had removed the bridges over the gaps in the causeways that linked the city to the surrounding lands, Cortés' men constructed a portable bridge to cross the water of the lake. On the rainy night of 10 July 1520, the Spaniards and their allies set out for the mainland via the causeway to Tlacopan. They placed the portable bridge in the first gap, but at that moment their movement was detected and Aztec forces attacked, both along the causeway and by means of canoes on the lake. The Spanish were thus caught on a narrow road with water or buildings on both sides.

The retreat quickly turned into a rout. The Spanish discovered that they could not remove their portable bridge unit from the first gap, and so had no choice but to leave it behind. The bulk of the Spanish infantry, left behind by Cortés and the other horsemen, had to cut their way through the masses of Aztec warriors opposing them. Many of the Spaniards, weighed down by their armor and booty, drowned in the causeway gaps or were killed by the Aztecs. Much of the wealth the Spaniards had acquired in Tenochtitlan was lost. The bridge was later called "Alvarado's Leap".

The channel is now a street in Mexico City, called "Puente de Alvarado" (Alvarado's Bridge), because it seemed Alvarado escaped across an invisible bridge (He may have been walking on the bodies of those soldiers and attackers who had preceded him, given the shallowness of the lake.).

It is said that Cortés, upon reaching the mainland at Tlacopan, wept over their losses. This episode is called "La Noche Triste" (The Night of Sorrows), and the old tree ("El árbol de la noche triste") where Cortés allegedly cried, is still a monument in Mexico City.

The Aztecs pursued and harassed the Spanish, who, guided by their Tlaxcalan allies, moved around Lake Zumpango towards a sanctuary in Tlaxcala. On 14 July 1520, the Aztecs attempted to destroy the Spanish for good at the Battle of Otumba. Although hard-pressed, the Spanish infantry was able to hold off the overwhelming numbers of enemy warriors, while the Spanish cavalry under the leadership of Cortés charged through the enemy ranks again and again. When Cortés and his men killed one of the Aztec leaders, the Aztecs broke off the battle and left the field.

In this retreat, the Spaniards suffered heavy casualties, losing 860 soldiers, 72 other Spanish members of Cortés' group, including five women, and 1,000 Tlaxcalan warriors. Several Aztec noblemen loyal to Cortés, including Cacamatzin, and their families also perished, including Moctezuma's son and two daughters.

==== Spaniards find refuge in Tlaxcala ====
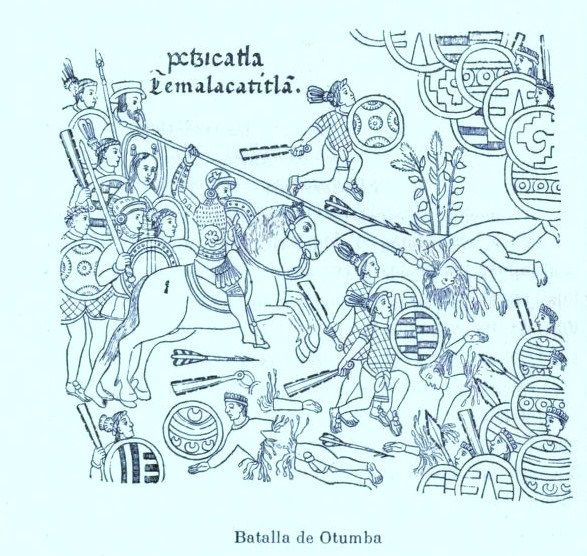
A page from the Lienzo de Tlaxcala, depicting the battle of Otumba

The Spanish were able to complete their escape to Tlaxcala. There, they were given assistance, since all 440 of them were wounded, with only 20 horses left. Maxixcatzin, Xicotencatl the Elder and Chichimecatecuhtli told Cortés' men: "Consider yourselves at home. Rest ... do not think it a small thing that you have escaped with your lives from that strong city ... if we thought of you as brave men before, we consider you much braver now."

Cortés got reinforcements when the Panuco River settlement was abandoned, and supply ships arrived from Cuba and Spain. Cortés also had built 13 brigantines and had them mounted with cannons, turning Lake Texcoco into a strategic body of water to assault Tenochtitlan. Xicotencatl the Younger, however, sought an alliance with the Mexicans, but was opposed.

Cortés sent Diego de Ordaz and the remnants of Narvaez's men, on a ship to Spain, and Francisco Montejo on a ship to Santo Domingo to represent his case in the Royal Courts.

Cortés was able to pacify the country, after the indigenous realized the Spaniards put "an end to the rape and robbery that the Mexicans practised.". Finally, Xicotencatl the Elder, baptized as Don Lorenzo de Vargas, agreed to support Cortés' expedition against Texcoco. According to Bernal Diaz, he sent more than 10,000 warriors under the command of Chichimecatecuhtli as Cortés marched on the day after Christmas 1520.

==== Siege and fall of Tenochtitlan ====
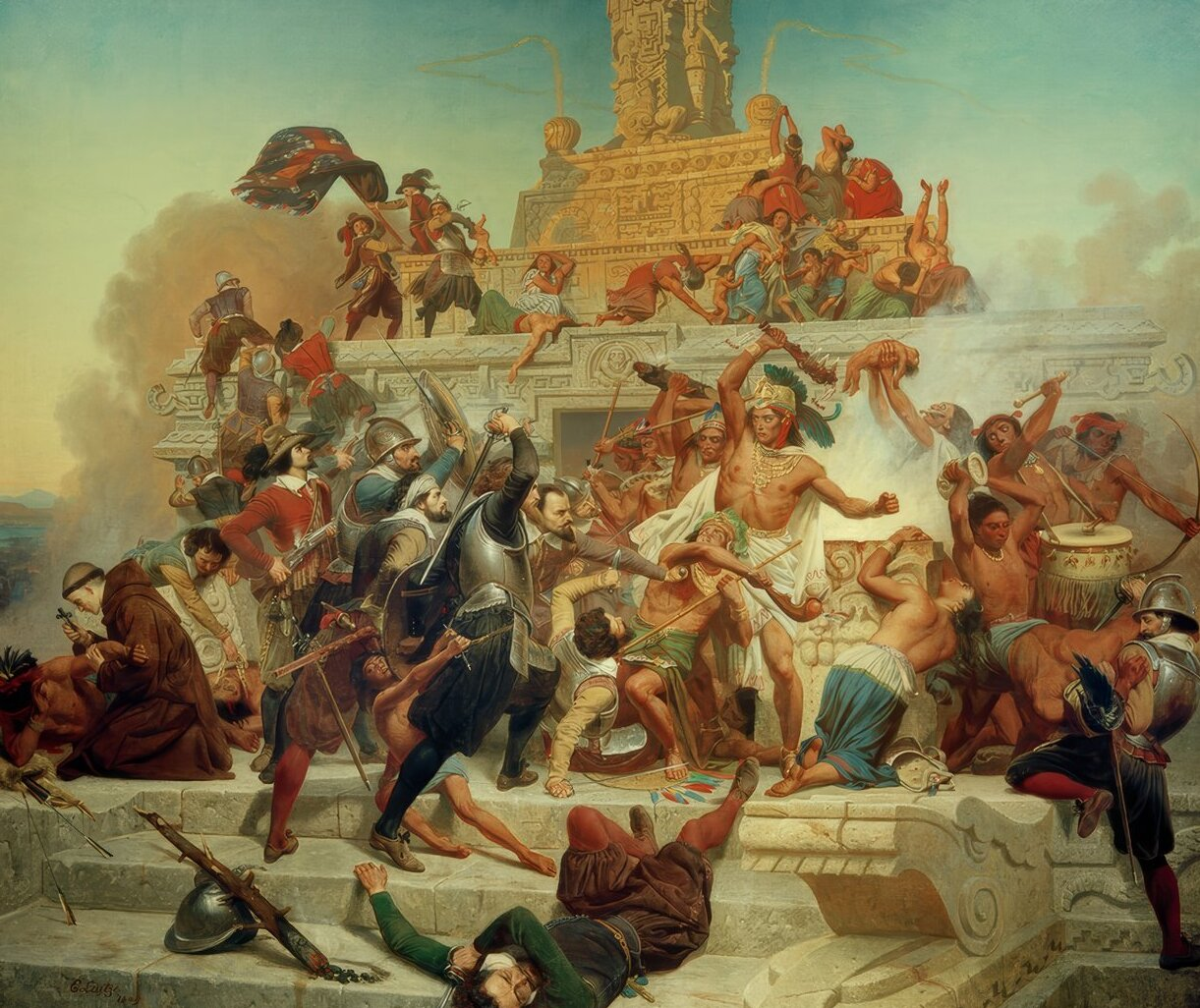
The Storming of the Teocalli by Cortez and His Troops (Emanuel Leutze, 1848)

The Aztecs were struck by a smallpox plague starting in September 1520, which lasted seventy days. Many were killed, including their new leader, the Emperor Cuitlahuac.

The joint forces of Tlaxcala and Cortés proved to be formidable. One by one they took over most of the cities under Aztec control, some in battle, others by diplomacy. In the end, only Tenochtitlan and the neighboring city of Tlatelolco remained unconquered or not allied with the Spaniards.

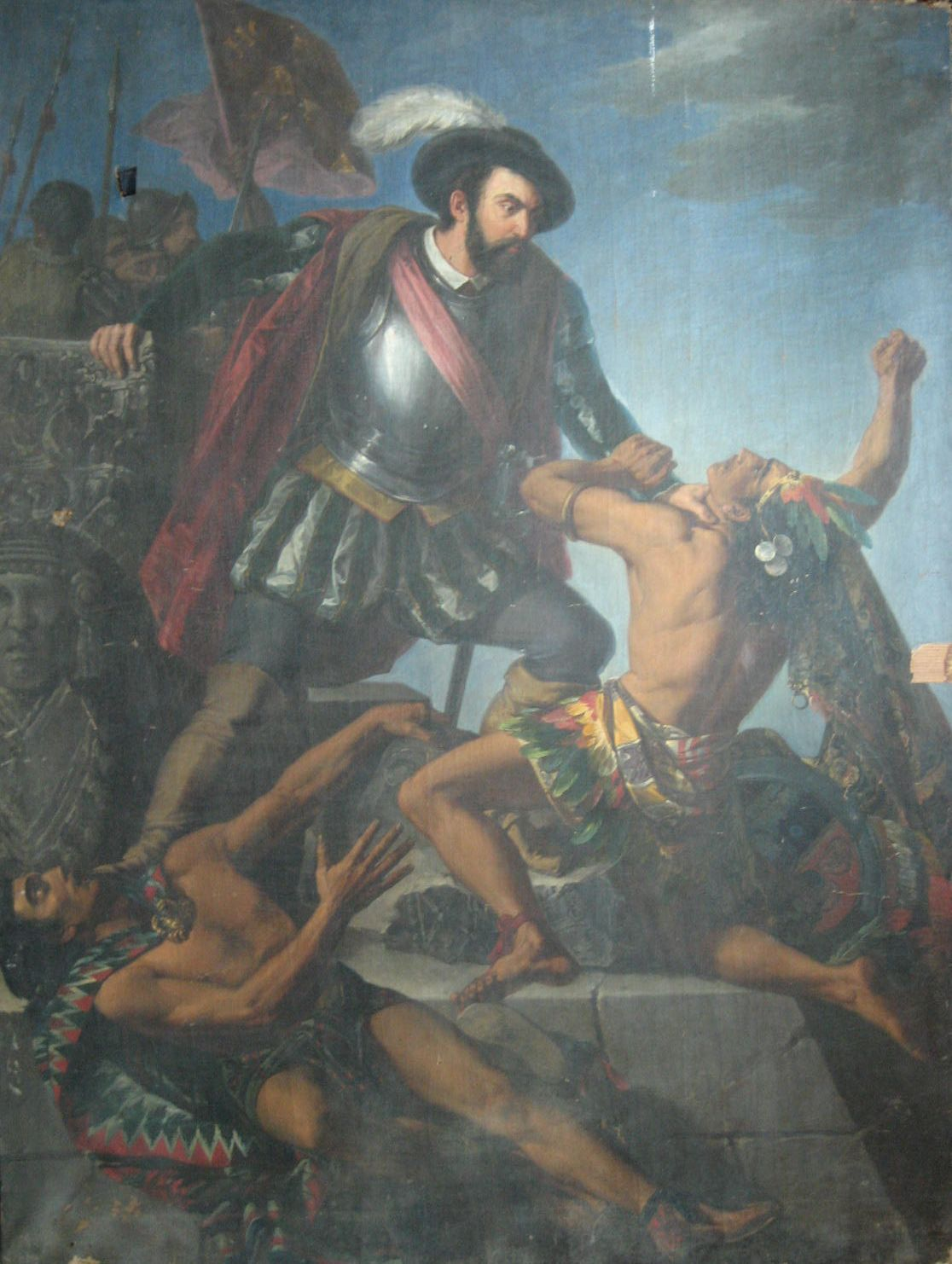
Hernan Cortés fight with two Aztecs.

Cortés then approached Tenochtitlan and mounted a siege of the city that involved cutting the causeways from the mainland and controlling the lake with armed brigantines constructed by the Spanish and transported overland to the lake. The Siege of Tenochtitlan lasted eight months. The besiegers cut off the supply of food and destroyed the aqueduct carrying water to the city.

Despite the stubborn Aztec resistance organized by their new emperor, Cuauhtémoc, the cousin of Moctezuma II, Tenochtitlan and Tlatelolco fell on 13 August 1521, during which the Emperor was captured trying to escape the city in a canoe. The siege of the city and its defense had both been brutal. Largely because he wanted to present the city to his king and emperor, Cortés had made several attempts to end the siege through diplomacy, but all offers were rejected. During the battle, the defenders cut the beating hearts from seventy Spanish prisoners-of-war at the altar to Huitzilopochtli, an act that infuriated the Spaniards.

Cortés then ordered the idols of the Aztec gods in the temples to be taken down and replaced with icons of Christianity. He also announced that the temple would never again be used for human sacrifice. Human sacrifice and reports of cannibalism, common among the natives of the Aztec Empire, had been a major reason motivating Cortés and encouraging his soldiers to avoid surrender while fighting to the death.

Tenochtitlan had been almost totally destroyed using the manpower of the Tlaxcalans plus fire and cannon fire during the siege, and once it finally fell, the Spanish continued its destruction, as they soon began to establish the foundations of what would become Mexico City on the site. The surviving Aztec people were forbidden to live in Tenochtitlan and the surrounding isles, and were banished to live in Tlatelolco.

Conquistador Bernal Díaz del Castillo seemed remorseful after the sacking of Tenochtitlan. He said later in his book, The True History of the Conquest of New Spain that the natives had showered them with gifts, and given them rooms and food. He was dazzled by the gardens and the canals that flowed around the city. "When I beheld the scenes around me", said Díaz, "I thought within myself, this was the garden of the world. All of the wonders I beheld that day, nothing now remains. All is overthrown and lost."

== Further Spanish wars of conquest ==
=== Michoacan ===
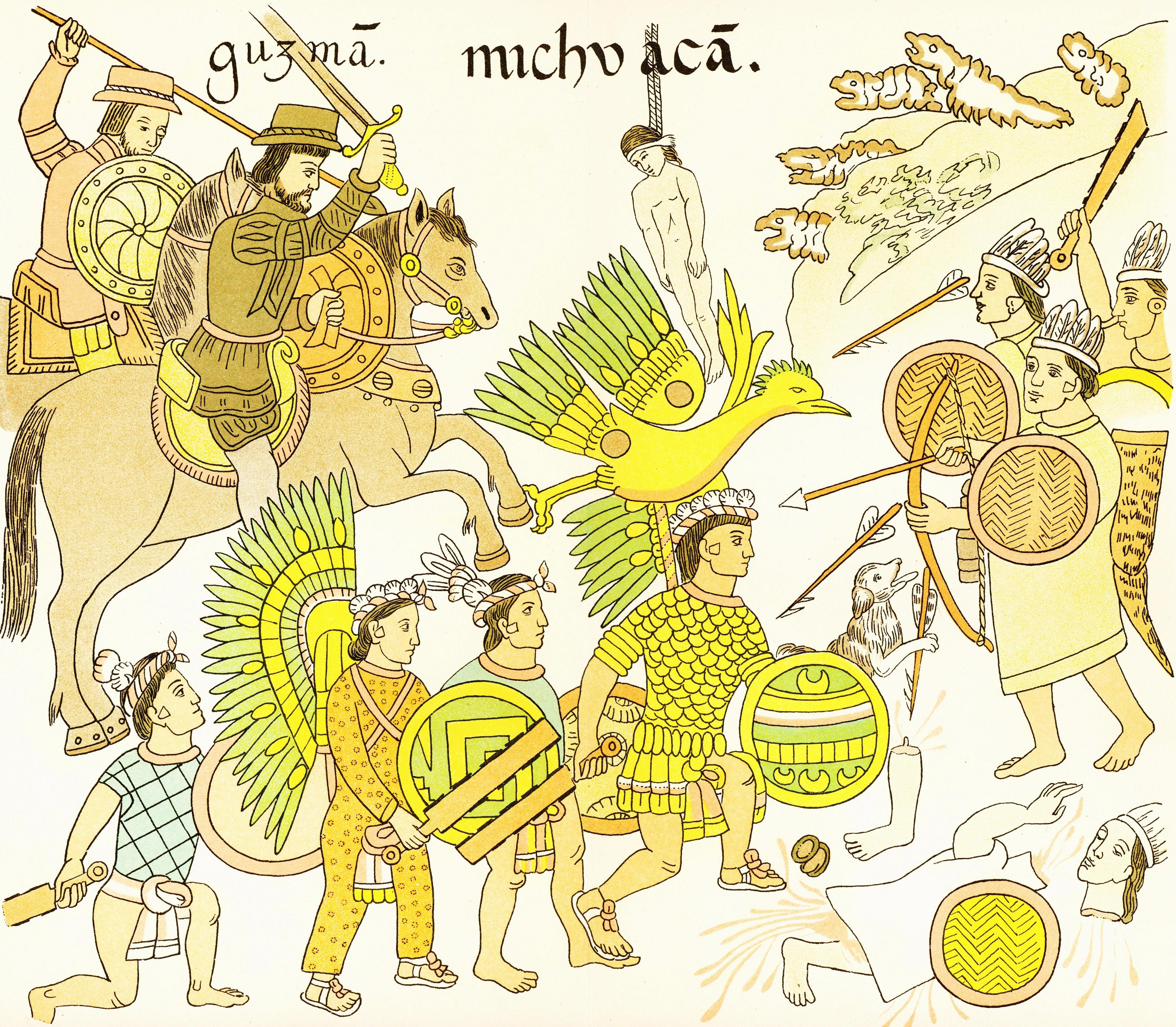
Nuño de Guzmán, a rival of Cortés, led Spanish soldiers with Tlaxcalan allies in the conquest of Michoacan.

After hearing about the fall of the Aztec Empire, Irecha Tangaxuan II sent emissaries to the Spanish victors (the Purépecha empire was a contemporary and enemy of the Aztec Empire). A few Spaniards went with them to Tzintzuntzan, where they were presented to the ruler and gifts were exchanged. They returned with samples of gold and Cortés' interest in the Tarascan state was awakened.

In 1522 a Spanish force under the leadership of Cristobal de Olid was sent into Purépecha territory and arrived at Tzintzuntzan within days. The imperial army numbered many thousands, perhaps as many as 100,000, but at the crucial moment they chose not to fight. Tangaxuan submitted to the Spanish administration, but for his cooperation was allowed a large degree of autonomy. This resulted in a strange arrangement where both Cortés and Tangáxuan considered themselves rulers of Michoacán for the following years: the population of the area paid tribute to them both.

In 1529, however, Nuño Beltrán de Guzmán, then president of the first Audiencia, decided to march on northwestern Mexico with a force of 5,000–8,000 men in search for new populations to subdue. He arrived in Michoacán and found out that Tangaxuan was still the de facto ruler of his empire, for which the conquistador allied himself with Don Pedro Panza Cuinierángari against the Irecha. Tangaxuan was tried with plotting a rebellion, withholding tribute, sodomy and heresy, and he was tortured and executed. His ashes were thrown into the Lerma River. A period of violence and turbulence began until being fully calmed by Vasco de Quiroga, Bishop of Michoacan, in 1533. During the next decades, puppet rulers were installed by the Spanish government.

=== Conquest of the Yucatán Peninsula ===
The Spanish conquest of Yucatán took almost 170 years. The whole process could have taken longer were it not for three separate epidemics that took a heavy toll on the Native Americans, causing the population to fall by half and weakening the traditional social structure.

=== Chichimec Wars ===
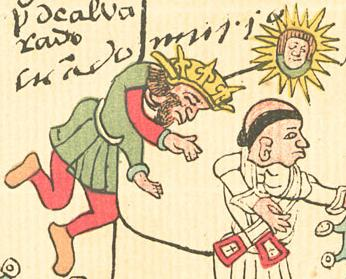
Pedro de Alvarado's death in 1541, depicted in the indigenous Codex Telleriano-Remensis. The glyph to the right of his head represents his Nahuatl name, Tonatiuh ("Sun").

After the Spanish conquest of central Mexico, expeditions were sent further northward in Mesoamerica, to the region known as La Gran Chichimeca. The expeditions under Nuño Beltrán de Guzmán were particularly harsh on the Chichimeca population, causing them to rebel under the leadership of Tenamaxtli and thus launch the Mixton War.

In 1540, the Chichimecas fortified Mixtón, Nochistlán, and other mountain towns then besieged the Spanish settlement in Guadalajara. The famous conquistador Pedro de Alvarado, coming to the aid of acting governor Cristóbal de Oñate, led an attack on Nochistlán. However, the Chichimecas counter-attacked and Alvarado's forces were routed. Under the leadership of Viceroy Don Antonio de Mendoza, the Spanish forces and their Indigenous allies ultimately succeeded in recapturing the towns and suppressing resistance. However, fighting did not completely come to a halt in the ensuing years.

In 1546, Spanish authorities discovered silver in the Zacatecas region and established mining settlements in Chichimeca territory which altered the terrain and the Chichimeca traditional way of life. The Chichimeca resisted the intrusions on their ancestral lands by attacking travelers and merchants along the "silver roads". The ensuing Chichimeca War (1550–1590) would become the longest and costliest conflict between Spanish forces and indigenous peoples in the Americas. The attacks intensified with each passing year. In 1554, the Chichimecas inflicted a great loss upon the Spanish when they attacked a train of sixty wagons and captured more than 30,000 pesos worth of valuables. By the 1580s, thousands had died and Spanish mining settlements in Chichimeca territory were continually under threat. In 1585, Don Alvaro Manrique de Zúñiga, Marquis of Villamanrique, was appointed viceroy. The viceroy was infuriated when he learned that some Spanish soldiers had begun supplementing their incomes by raiding the villages of peaceful Indians in order to sell them into slavery. With no military end to the conflict in sight, he was determined to restore peace to that region and launched a full-scale peace offensive by negotiating with Chichimeca leaders and providing them with lands, agricultural supplies, and other goods. This policy of "peace by purchase" finally brought an end to the Chichimeca War.

== Aztecs under Spanish rule ==
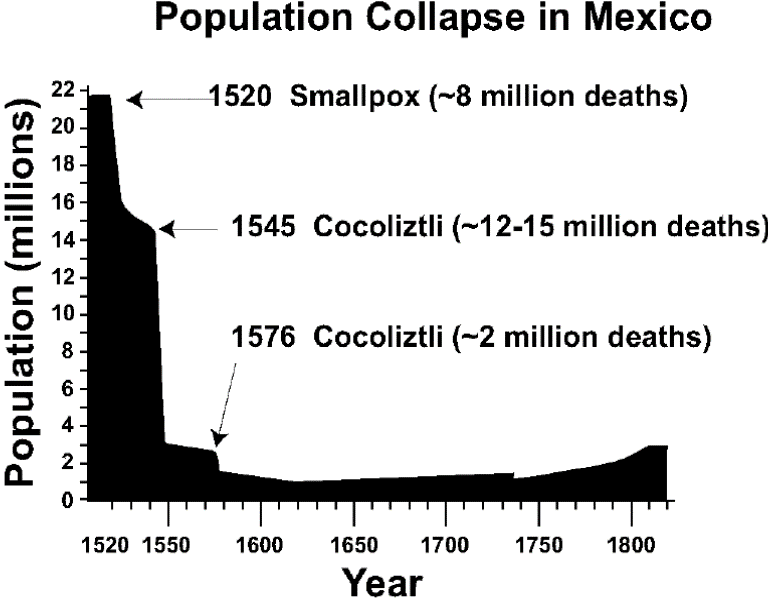
Population collapse in the history of Mexico (16th–17th centuries), attributed to repeated epidemics of smallpox and cocoliztli viruses. The viral outbreaks were caused by the Spanish invasion and colonization of the Americas..

The Council of the Indies was constituted in 1524 and the first Audiencia in 1527. In 1535, Charles V, the Holy Roman Emperor (who was as the King of Spain later known as Charles I), named the Spanish nobleman Don Antonio de Mendoza the first Viceroy of New Spain. Mendoza was entirely loyal to the Spanish crown, unlike the conqueror of Mexico Hernán Cortés, who had demonstrated that he was independent-minded and defied official orders when he threw off the authority of Governor Velázquez in Cuba. The name "New Spain" had been suggested by Cortés and was later confirmed officially by Mendoza.

The Aztec Empire ceased to exist with the fall of Tenochtitlan in August 1521. The empire had been composed of separate city-states that had either allied with or been conquered by the Mexica of Tenochtitlan, and rendered tribute to the Mexica while maintaining their internal ruling structures. Those polities now came under Spanish rule, also retaining their internal structures of ruling elites and tribute-paying commoners, as well as land holding and other economic structures being largely intact. Two key works by historian Charles Gibson, Tlaxcala in the Sixteenth Century (1952) and his monograph The Aztecs Under Spanish Rule: A History of the Indians of the Valley of Mexico, 1519–1810 (1964) were central in reshaping the historiography of the indigenous and their communities from the Spanish conquest to the 1810 Mexican independence era.

Scholars who were part of a branch of Mesoamerican ethnohistory, more recently called the New Philology have, using indigenous texts in the indigenous languages, been able to examine in considerable detail how the indigenous lived during the era of Spanish colonial rule. A major work that utilizes colonial-era indigenous texts as its main source is James Lockhart's The Nahuas After the Conquest: Postconquest Central Mexican History and Philology. The key to understanding how considerable continuity of pre-Conquest indigenous structures was possible was the Spanish colonial utilization of the indigenous nobility. In the colonial era, the indigenous nobility were largely recognized as nobles by the Spanish colonial regime, with privileges including the noble Spanish title don for noblemen and doña for noblewomen. To this day, the title of Duke of Moctezuma is held by a Spanish noble family. A few of the indigenous nobility learned Spanish. Spanish friars taught indigenous tribes to write their own languages in Latin letters, which soon became a self-perpetuating tradition at the local level. Their surviving writings are crucial in our knowledge of colonial era Nahuas.

The first mendicants in central Mexico, particularly the Franciscans and Dominicans learned the indigenous language of Nahuatl, in order to evangelize to the indigenous people in their native tongue. Early mendicants created texts in order to forward the project of Christianization. Particularly important were the 1571 Spanish-Nahuatl dictionary compiled by the Franciscan Fray Alonso de Molina, and his 1569 bilingual Nahuatl-Spanish confessional manual for priests. A major project by the Franciscans in Mexico was the compilation of knowledge on Nahua religious beliefs and culture that friar Bernardino de Sahagún oversaw using indigenous informants, resulting in a number of important texts and culminating in a 12 volume text, The General History of the Things of New Spain published in English as the Florentine Codex. The Spanish crown via the Council of the Indies and the Franciscan order in the late sixteenth century became increasingly hostile to works in the indigenous languages written by priests and clerics, concerned that they were heretical and an impediment to the Indians' true conversion.

To reward Spaniards who participated in the conquest of what is now contemporary Mexico, the Spanish crown authorized grants of native labor, in particular the assignment of entire indigenous communities to labor via the Encomienda system. The indigenous were not slaves under this system, chattel bought and sold or removed from their home community, but the system was still one of forced labor. The indigenous people of Central Mexico had practices rendering labor and tribute products to their polity's elites and those elites to the Mexica overlords in Tenochtitlan, so the Spanish system of encomienda was built on pre-existing patterns of labor service.

The Spanish conquerors in Mexico during the early colonial era lived off the labor of the indigenous peoples. Due to some horrifying instances of abuse against the native peoples, Bishop Bartolomé de las Casas suggested importing black slaves to replace them. Las Casas later repented when he saw the even worse treatment given to the black slaves.

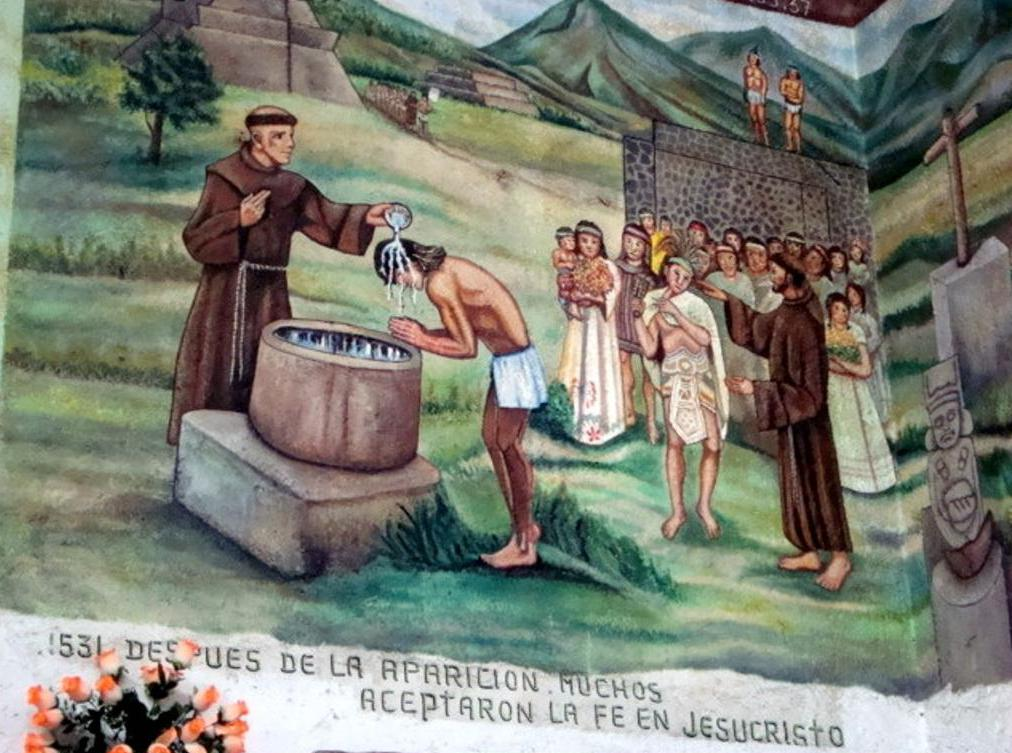
Evangelization of Mexico

According to West, "slavery was a well-established institution among the Aztecs and their neighbors." "During the Conquest, Spaniards legally enslaved large numbers of natives – men, women and children – as booty of warfare, branding each individual on the cheek." In fact, "Cortés owned several hundred, used mainly in gold placering." Indian slavery was abolished in 1542 but persisted until the 1550s.

The Aztec education system was abolished and replaced by a very limited church education. Even some foods associated with Mesoamerican religious practice, such as amaranth, were forbidden. Catholic missionaries campaigned against cultural traditions of the Aztecs, and the use of psilocybin mushrooms, like other pre-Christian traditions, was quickly suppressed. In converting people to Catholicism, the Spanish pushed for a switch from teonanácatl to the Catholic sacrament of the Eucharist. Despite this history, in some remote areas, the use of teonanácatl has persisted.

In the 16th century, perhaps 240,000 Spaniards entered American ports. They were joined by 450,000 in the next century. Unlike the English-speaking colonists of North America, the majority of the Spanish colonists were single men who married or made concubines of the natives, and were even encouraged to do so by Queen Isabella I during the earliest days of colonization. As a result of these unions, as well as concubinage and secret mistresses, mixed race individuals known as mestizos became the majority of the Mexican population in the centuries following the Spanish conquest.

== Cultural depictions of the Aztecs ==
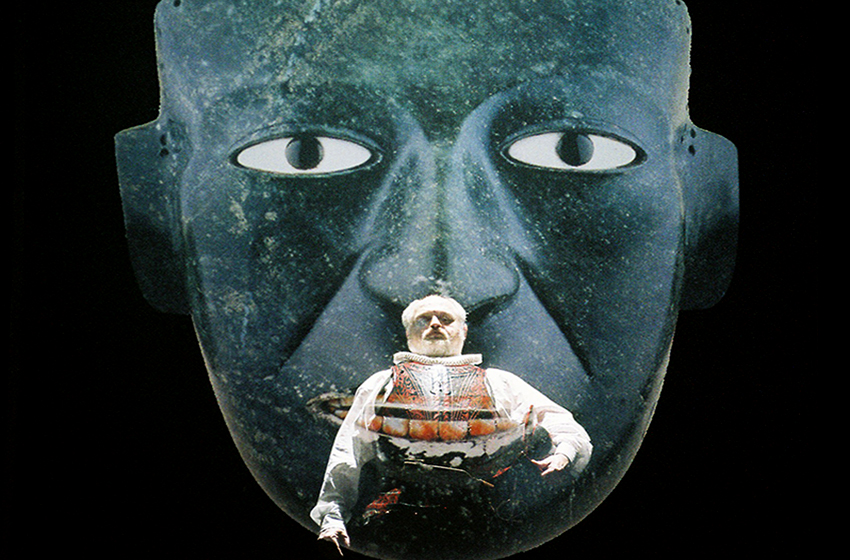
Scene from the opera La Conquista, 2005

The Spanish conquest of the Aztec Empire is the subject of an opera, La Conquista (2005) and of a set of six symphonic poems, La Nueva España (1992–99) by Italian composer Lorenzo Ferrero.

Cortés's conquest has been depicted in numerous television documentaries. These include in an episode of Engineering an Empire as well as in the BBC series Heroes and Villains, with Cortés being portrayed by Brian McCardie.

Captain from Castile (1947) is about early Cortés and the Aztec.

The expedition was also partially included in the animated film The Road to El Dorado as the main characters Tulio and Miguel end up as stowaways on Hernán Cortés' fleet to Mexico. Here, Cortés is represented as a merciless and ambitious villain, leading a quest to find El Dorado, the legendary city of gold in the New World. Hernán Cortés is voiced by Jim Cummings.

The aftermath of the Spanish conquest, including the Aztecs' struggle to preserve their cultural identity, is the subject of the Mexican feature film The Other Conquest, directed by Salvador Carrasco.

Historian Daniele Bolelli did an in-depth coverage of the Spanish conquest over four episodes of his History on Fire podcast.

Mexican muralist Diego Rivera (1886–1957) painted History of Morelos, Conquest and Revolution on the walls of the Cortés Palace in Cuernavaca in 1929–1930.

An historical drama series in Mayan, Nahuatl, and Spanish entitled Hernán was co-produced by Televisión Azteca, Dopamine, and Onza Entertainment in 2019. The plot revolves around Hernán Cortés and his cadre from his arrival at the Mexican coast until the defeat of the Mexicas.

A fictionalized version of the fall of Tenochtitlan was depicted in the 2021 Marvel Cinematic Universe film Eternals.

== See also ==
- Aztec warfare
- Aztecs
- Aztec influence in Spain
- Historiography of Colonial Spanish America
- History of Mexico City
- History of smallpox in Mexico
- List of wars by death toll
- New Spain
- Spanish conquest of Chiapas
- Spanish conquest of Guatemala
- Spanish conquest of Honduras
- Spanish conquest of Yucatán
- Spanish Empire
- Spanish conquest of the Inca Empire

== Sources ==
- Clodfelter, M. (2017). Warfare and Armed Conflicts: A Statistical Encyclopedia of Casualty and Other Figures, 1492–2015 (4th ed.). Jefferson, North Carolina: McFarland. ISBN 978-0786474707.
