= Champotón, Campeche =

City in the Mexican state of Campeche

Champotón
- City
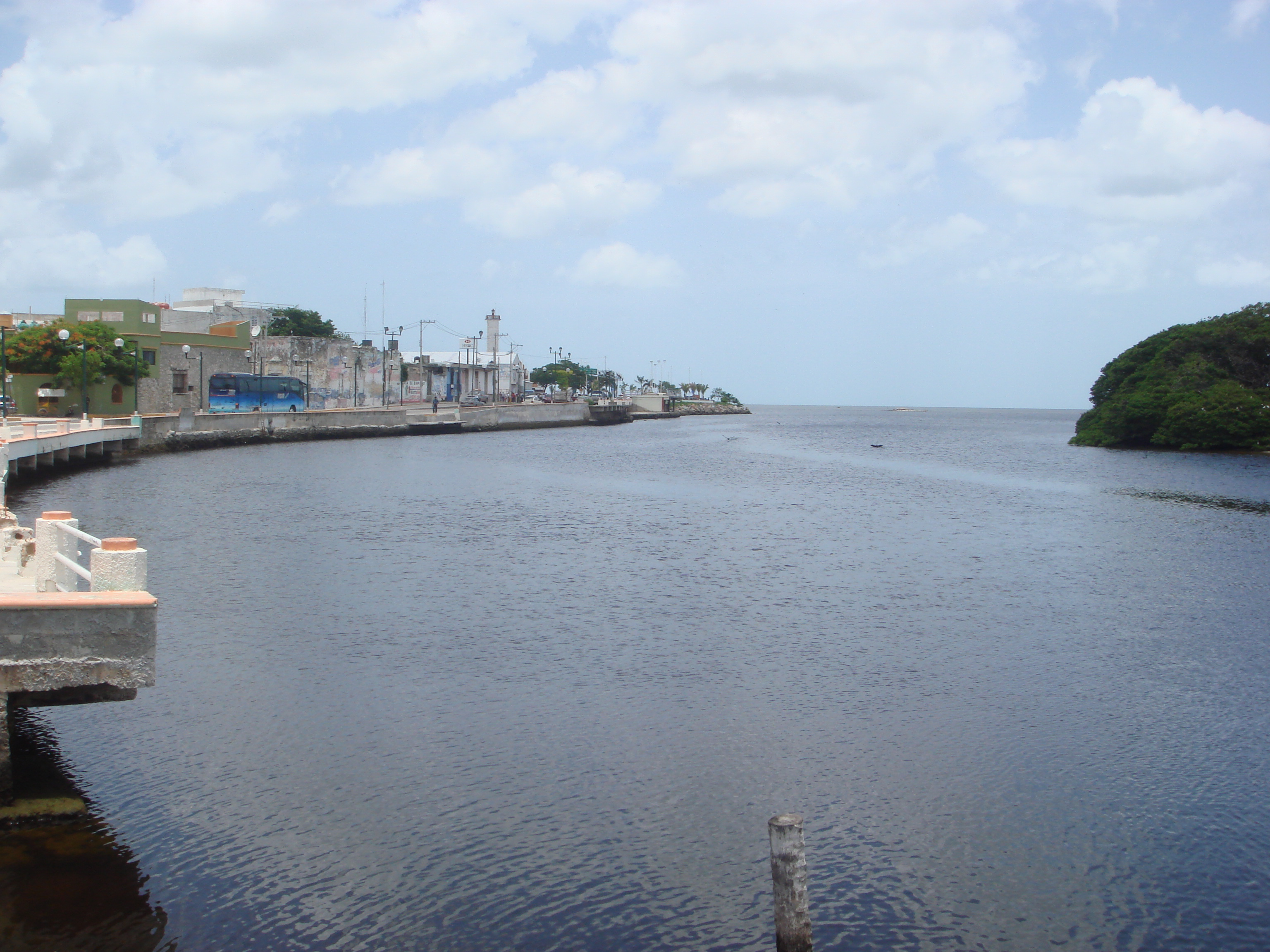
- Champotón at Bay of Campeche

- Location within Mexico
- Coordinates: 19°21′N 90°43′W
- Country: Mexico
- State: Campeche
- Municipality: Champotón
- City Founded: 1538

Government
  - Mayor: Xicoténcatl González Hernández (PRI)
- Elevation: 10 m (33 ft)

Population (2010)
  - Total: 30,881
  - Demonym: Champotonero
- Time zone: UTC−6 (CST)
- Postal code: 24400
- Area code: 982
- Website: http://www.champoton.gob.mx/

Champotón is a small city in Champotón Municipality in the Mexican state of Campeche, located at 19°21′N 90°43′W, about 60 km south of the city of Campeche where the small Champotón river meets the coast of the Gulf of Mexico. At the 2010 census it had a population of 30,881.

Champotón, historically also called Chakanputun, Chanpaton and Chanputun, was a city of the Maya civilization dating back to at least the 10th century before it was conquered by Spain in the 16th century. There the famous battle "Mala Pelea" occurred. In the first Spanish exploration (1517), they were defeated by the Maya. Juan de Grijalva's expedition exacted revenge in 1518.

== History ==
According to the Chilam Balam of Chumayel, the Itzáes began to arrive at the Yucatán peninsula in the year 435, begun in Bacalar and rising to the north and west, in this way they also inhabited Chakán Putum.

In the year 869, coming from Nonohual came Ah Mekat Tutul Xiu, who was the chief of the tutul xiúes and forced the first Itzáes to retreat into the jungle and leave Chakán Putum and other cities, the tutul xiúes were settled mainly in Uxmal more late in 987, some of the Itzaes who lived "under the trees, under the ashes and under the misery" returned again to Chichen Itza, others of the Itzaes separated and founded Mayapán (1047 AD), the latter since then He knew them as the "Cocomes".

Cocomes, itzáes and tutul xiúes formed the Mayapán League that began in 1047. The Cocomes made war with the Itzáes who emigrated to the Guatemalan Petén, and later the Tutul Xiúes fought with the Cocomes, eventually disintegrating the union in 1441.

After the Yucatán Peninsula, was divided into 16 cacicazgos, in the state of Campeche, was part of the chiefdom of Ah Canul, Can Pech, and Chakán Putum. The struggles between cacicazgos were frequent, especially between cocomes and tutul xiúes.

In 1517 the first Spanish expedition to the Mexican coasts was made by Francisco Hernández de Córdoba, first Spanish conquistador to arrive to the Yucatán Peninsula, who after having touched Isla Mujeres and Cabo Catoche continued skirting the peninsula's coastline, arriving in Campeche on Sunday of San Lázaro. The natives of Campeche welcomed the Spaniards, in this place they were supplied with water, and they returned to embark to continue their journey, however they incurred the mistake of not closing their pipes and water containers, so they had to disembark again a little further south in a nearby place called Champoton (Chakán Putum).

According to the story of the soldier and chronicler Bernal Díaz del Castillo, it is known that three days later the expeditionaries continued along the coast and reached Chakanputún, which they renamed Champoton and where they met with a thousand heavily armed Maya who attacked the Spaniards by killing to more than 50 and leaving the captain wounded. The Spanish expedition withdrew.

After this fierce fight, the Spaniards had to flee without water and with many wounded, 57 dead and two kidnappings (Alonso Boto and an old Portuguese), the same Hernández de Córdoba left with 33 wounds, because the Mayans soon realized that he was the boss and as described by Diaz del Castillo shouted "calachuni", "calachuni" (which means "the boss"), they fled to Florida, a place known by the pilot Antón de Alaminos looking for water, but there they were also repelled by the natives (Bernal Díaz del Castillo who participated in the trip, was wounded in Florida) and finally returned to the port of Carenas near Havana in Cuba, Hernández de Córdoba would die 10 days later as a result of injuries in Sancti Espiritus.

Due to these events, Champoton was baptized as "Puerto de Mala Pelea". November December The Moch (the "stubby", the one - armed Cohuó) chief was the first Indian hero; This Mayan chief was able to provide the first defeat to a foreign invading army in America.

The following year, in 1518, the second expedition commanded by Juan de Grijalva departed from Cuba, after passing through Cozumel and the Bay of Ascension, they circled the coast of the peninsula again until they reached Champoton again to obtain water, to the experience of the first expedition, the Spaniards were more prepared to face and subdue the natives. The balance of the confrontation inclined to the Europeans who had 7 casualties (among them Juan de Quiteria) and 60 wounded (Juan de Grijalva was wounded with three arrows and lost two teeth), the Mayans couohes suffered many losses (200), among the chief cacique died, and the rest fled inland.

Grijalva sent his translators (Julianillo and Melchorejo, Mayas trapped in Cabo Catoche during the first expedition who had already learned Castilian) to call other caciques, nobody came to the call, so this expedition left Champoton and continued its route to the mouth of the river since then called "Grijalva" in Tabasco, in this expedition came Francisco de Montejo for the first time.

In the third expedition (1519) commanded by Hernán Cortés, his intention was to disembark again to avenge the previous expeditionaries, but the strong wind did not favor the disembarkation, and the pilots convinced Cortés to continue straight ahead with the boats, in such a way that They passed by the Lagoon of Terms, where they would face the Chontal Maya of the region, it is likely that the Mayans of Can Pech, and Chakan Putúm made a common front before the disembarkation made at a point near Zintla (Centla).

After a strong confrontation ( Battle of Centla ), Cortes subdued and agreed with the Mayans founding the town of Santa Maria de la Victoria, (Frontier). It was here that the Mayans gave Cortés to Malintzin along with other slaves as an act of peace, it is possible that "Doña Marina" was a slave of the Mayans of Champotón.

In 1526 Francisco de Montejo, who had participated in the conquest of Tenochtitlan, traveled to Spain and requested permission to carry out the conquest of the Yucatán Peninsula, so in 1526 the Spanish crown awarded Montejo the title of "Adelantado, Governor, Chief Constable and Captain General of Yucatan ". The conquests of Champoton and Campeche were part of the Conquest of Yucatán, which was carried out in three stages.

In the first stage or attempt, Montejo dabbled between 1527 and 1529 in the northeast of the peninsula with the help of Captain Alonso Dávila, but they were repelled by the Mayans. In the second stage or attempt (1530-1535) Montejo dabbled in the west, managing to found in 1531 "Salamanca de Campeche". Alonso Dávila was sent by Montejo to cross the peninsula south and founded in Bacalar Villa Real, but this position had to be abandoned. The mighty Mayans would rebel in the battle of San Bernabé on June 11, 1531, in the vicinity of Campeche.

The son of Montejo known as Montejo "el Mozo" is defeated in the royal city of Chichen Itza towards the end of 1534, so in 1535, the Spaniards left the peninsula completely. From Honduras and then from Ciudad Real de Chiapa (San Cristobal de las Casas), Montejo "el adelantado" would turn orders to his son and nephew to enter the peninsula again.

Montejo "the Adelantado" asked Lorenzo de Godoy to move the town of San Pedro Tanoche in Tabasco to Champoton to establish the first position in the peninsula, which is why it was baptized as "Villa de San Pedro Champotón" in 1538. (the transfer of the village was not easy, according to the narrator of the conquistador Diego Sanchez who participated with his wife in this expedition).

Francisco de Montejo "el Mozo" was in Santa María de la Victoria recruiting soldiers and waiting for resources, an activity that took a long time. At first the Mayans in Champotón, cooperated with the Spaniards of the town, but when seeing that they were few they began to conspire. Francisco de Montejo, the nephew who had been sent by his cousin to help protect the position, realized this conspiracy and in a surprise operation kidnapped the Mayan caciques, taking them to Santa Maria de la Victoria, so that they would renew there obedience to "El Mozo" The name of the village changed to "Salamanca de Champotón".

In 1540 "El Mozo" from Santa María de la Victoria received material and human resources to attend the position of Champotón, a first advance to the north began and on October 4 the garrison of San Francisco de Campeche was established.

"El Adelantado" appointed "Francisco Gil" as "lieutenant governor and captain general" as successor to "El Mozo" in the establishment of Champotón, so "el Mozo", "el Sobrino" along with other captains would advance to the north and orient the conquest of Yucatán.

In 1543 the crown appointed Fray Bartolomé de las Casas to be bishop of Chiapas, its jurisdictional limits included Champotón. In 1546, led by Fray Luis de Villalpando, the Franciscan friars arrived: Juan de Albalote, Lorenzo de Bienvenida, Melchor de Benavente, Don Angel Maldonado and Don Juan de Herrera. That same year in 1546 Francisco de Montejo, "el Adelantado", introduced the cultivation of sugarcane.

During the Viceroyalty the city, head of an important sugar producing region, had a population composed of Spaniards, Mayans and black slaves, and was attacked in 1644, 1672 and 1748 by English pirates, which caused considerable damage.

The independence of Mexico was peaceful in Champoton, as in the rest of the Yucatán peninsula, and the city served as a refuge for the survivors of the rest of the peninsula during the Caste War, since the indigenous Mayans did not revolt in this area . By decree of Governor Miguel Barbachano of May 1, 1852, Champoton is elevated to the category of village and when the district of Campeche becomes a state, it becomes part of the new entity.

On November 19, 1863, there was a landing in Champotón by French forces who made a sudden and surprising attack, taking possession of the San Antonio Fort. For its part, the troop stationed in Champotón led by then-Colonel Pedro Celestino Brito, supported by Lieutenant José de la Rosa Ugarte and second lieutenant Durán, bravely faced it and managed to recover the bastion and that the French, in an approximate number of 50, they will retreat to their ships.

The Mexican Revolution did not seriously affect the population, except for the permanence during five months of a de-Huerta army in retreat in 1923–24. On November 7, 1957, Champoton was granted the title of city by decree no. 88 issued by the H. State Congress . Dr. Alberto Trueba Urbina made the formal declaration at the premises of the choreographic society "Cultura y Progreso" (current village casino) on December 8 of the same year at 11:30 am; he was municipal president the prof. Abraham Aguilar Espinosa.

By decree number 131, issued by the LXI Legislature of the Congress of the State of Campeche, published in the official newspaper of the State on June 27, 2014, was declared at the head of the Municipality of Champoton as "Heroic City of Champoton"; which is why all the references made to the Champoton head will be called "Heroic City".

== Demographics ==
As of 2010, the city of Champotón had a population of 30,881.

== Geography ==
=== Climate ===
Climate data for Champotón (1991–2020)
Month	Jan	Feb	Mar	Apr	May	Jun	Jul	Aug	Sep	Oct	Nov	Dec	Year
Record high °C (°F)	36.0 (96.8)	37.0 (98.6)	41.0 (105.8)	42.0 (107.6)	42.0 (107.6)	42.0 (107.6)	39.0 (102.2)	38.0 (100.4)	37.0 (98.6)	36.0 (96.8)	35.0 (95.0)	36.0 (96.8)	42.0 (107.6)
Mean daily maximum °C (°F)	28.7 (83.7)	30.5 (86.9)	32.5 (90.5)	35.0 (95.0)	35.5 (95.9)	34.3 (93.7)	34.1 (93.4)	33.6 (92.5)	33.0 (91.4)	31.7 (89.1)	30.1 (86.2)	29.3 (84.7)	32.4 (90.3)
Daily mean °C (°F)	22.9 (73.2)	24.2 (75.6)	25.8 (78.4)	28.2 (82.8)	29.1 (84.4)	28.5 (83.3)	28.2 (82.8)	27.9 (82.2)	27.8 (82.0)	26.7 (80.1)	24.7 (76.5)	23.7 (74.7)	26.5 (79.7)
Mean daily minimum °C (°F)	17.1 (62.8)	17.9 (64.2)	19.1 (66.4)	21.4 (70.5)	22.6 (72.7)	22.8 (73.0)	22.2 (72.0)	22.3 (72.1)	22.5 (72.5)	21.6 (70.9)	19.4 (66.9)	18.1 (64.6)	20.6 (69.1)
Record low °C (°F)	8.0 (46.4)	8.0 (46.4)	8.0 (46.4)	11.0 (51.8)	14.0 (57.2)	18.0 (64.4)	18.0 (64.4)	18.0 (64.4)	19.0 (66.2)	12.0 (53.6)	12.0 (53.6)	8.0 (46.4)	8.0 (46.4)
Average precipitation mm (inches)	28.5 (1.12)	24.4 (0.96)	12.4 (0.49)	17.1 (0.67)	58.7 (2.31)	220.7 (8.69)	184.1 (7.25)	226.5 (8.92)	230.6 (9.08)	162.8 (6.41)	65.9 (2.59)	43.2 (1.70)	1,274.9 (50.19)
Average precipitation days (≥ 0.1 mm)	5.2	3.2	2.8	2.0	4.9	15.0	15.3	17.3	16.3	12.3	6.0	5.3	105.6
Source: Servicio Meteorológico National
