= Bay of Campeche =

Bight in the southern area of the Gulf of Mexico

- Bahía de Campeche; Campeche Sound
- Bay of Campeche
- Location: Campeche; Tabasco; Veracruz
- Coordinates: 20°N 94°W
- Part of: American Mediterranean Sea
- Ocean/sea sources: Gulf of Mexico
- Basin countries: Mexico
- Max. length: 152 nautical miles (175 mi; 282 km)
- Max. width: 378 nautical miles (435 mi; 700 km)
- Surface area: 41,909 square nautical miles (55,500 sq mi; 143,740 km^{2})
- Islands: Triángulo Sur; Triángulo Oeste; Triángulo Este; Cayos Arcas

The Bay of Campeche (Spanish: Bahía de Campeche), or Campeche Sound, is a bight in the southern area of the Gulf of Mexico, forming the north side of the Isthmus of Tehuantepec. It is surrounded on three sides by the Mexican states of Campeche, Tabasco and Veracruz.

== Etymology ==
It was named by Francisco Hernández de Córdoba and Antón de Alaminos during their expedition in 1517.

== Geology ==
The area of the bay is 6,000 square miles (16,000 km^{2}) and maximum depth of the bay is approximately 180 feet (55 m). Sediment in the bay is calcareous and terrigenous. Stone from the region originates from the Jurassic, Cretaceous, and Cenozoic.

The Cantarell Complex of five oil fields lies beneath the Bay of Campeche. In 2003, it was the second most productive oil field in the world, then supplying about two thirds of Mexico's crude oil output, but it went into a steep decline soon thereafter.

On June 3, 1979, Ixtoc I, an exploratory oil well located in the bay, suffered a blowout that caused a catastrophic explosion, resulting in the world's largest peacetime oil spill at the time.

== Hydrology ==
Several rivers flow into the Bay of Campeche, including the Candelaria, Coatzacoalcos, Grijalva, Papaloapan, and Usumacinta Rivers. These rivers provide a significant amount of sediment to the bay.

On the southern shore are several lagoons and swamps, including Laguna de Términos.

In spring, an eddy forms in the eastern Bay of Campeche. The eddy move westward until dissipating by winter.

== Climate ==
During the months of June and July, the Bay of Campeche is considered one of the "hot" breeding spots for Atlantic hurricanes.

It experiences strong winds from the north from November into February along its western edge, with the winds ultimately funneling between the mountains and out into the Pacific near Salina Cruz.

On the other hand, the bay is also known for being a hurricane "graveyard", with unusually weak steering currents in the area causing hurricanes to slow down and meander, starving themselves (for example, Hurricane Roxanne in 1995). The bay is also considered the eastern border on the main migration routes for birds in the Americas.

== Gallery ==
Depictions of Bahía de Campeche

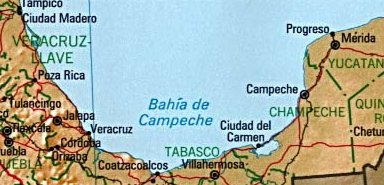
Map of the Bay of Campeche

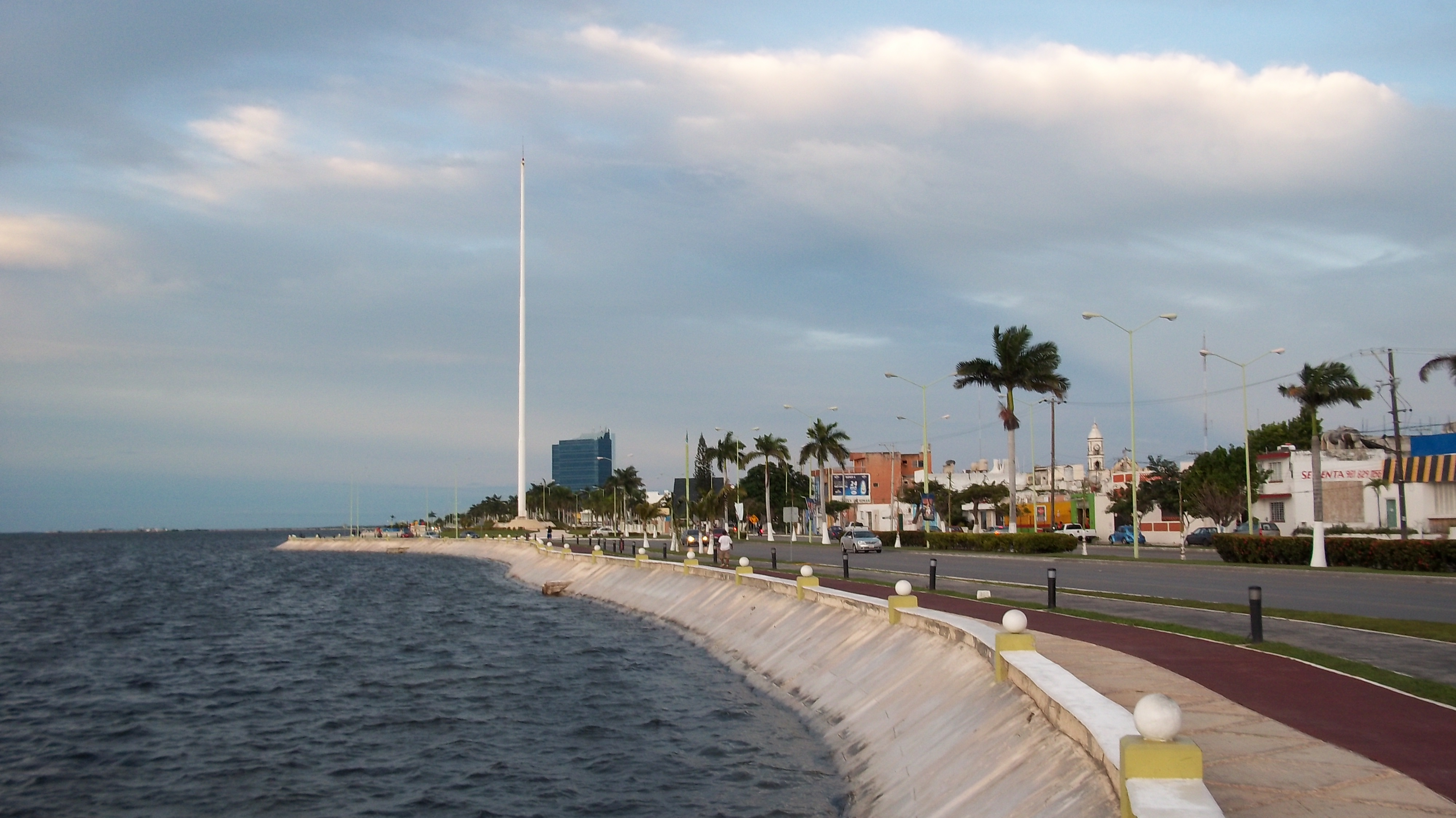
Promenade on the edge of the Bay of Campeche

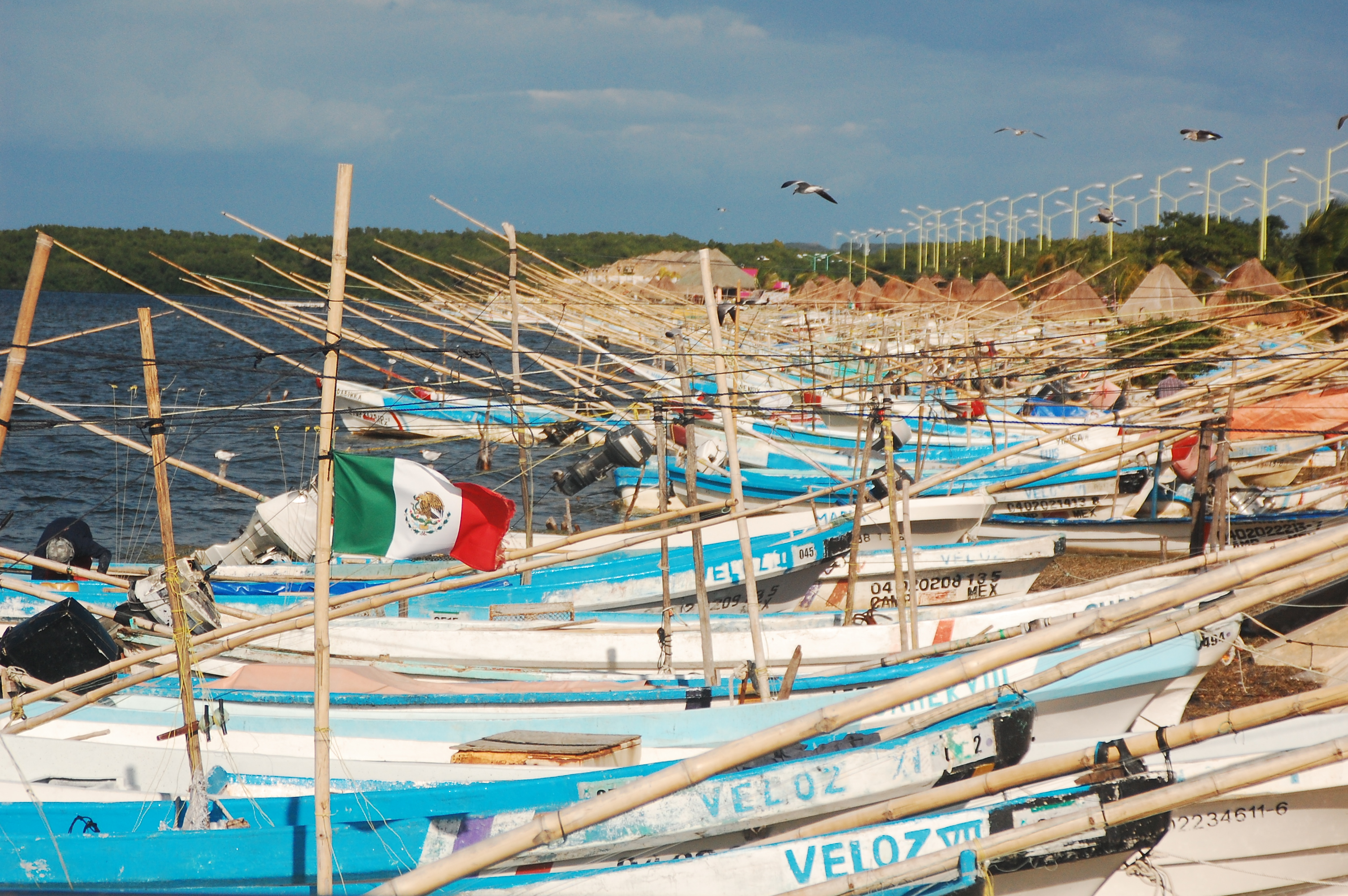
Boats at Bay of Campeche
