= Alonso Hernández Puertocarrero =

Spanish conquistador

Alonso Hernández Puertocarrero (before 1495–1523) was a Spanish conquistador who was part of Hernán Cortés's expedition of conquest of what is today Mexico.

== Biography ==
=== Conquest of Mexico ===
According to Bernal Diaz del Castillo, Puertocarrero was one of only 14 Spanish horseman in the Battle of Centla, the first military engagement of the Spanish conquest of Mexico.

Soon after arriving on the eastern shore of Mexico with a gift of a grey mare from Cortés, Hernández was elected alcayde along with Francisco de Montejo of Villa Rica de la Vera Cruz.

After the Battle of Centla at Potonchán, Cortés awarded Hernandez with Malinche for use as a slave who was one of 20 slave girls given to the Spaniards as part of a peace treaty with the defeated city. However, Cortés later took Malinche back for himself after discovering she could speak Nahuatl along with Chontal Mayan thus making her indispensable as a translator and as a cultural interpreter. Later, Hernandez received the daughter of Totonac Chief Cuesco as a gift and baptized her Doña Francisca.

Cortés also sent Hernandez, along with de Montejo, back to Spain to provide King Charles with details of the expedition.

=== Emissary to the court ===
In 1519. Puertocarrero was sent from the newly formed colony of Veracruz together with Francisco de Montejo and Anton de Alaminos to Spain in order to present the king with his share of gold from the Cortés's expedition, as well to defend Cortes before the Council of Indies from the accusations levied by Diego Velasquez, governor of Cuba, who has declared Cortes and his men as rebels and outlaws for defying his orders. The emissaries defended themselves from the accusations proclaiming their obedience to the supreme justice of the king, as well as pointing out that they have fitted out the expedition to Mexico at their own expense, while the governor Velasquez had sold them everything they needed at the extreme price. To bolster their legal arguments with some bribe, they have brought rich gifts, among them two massive hand-mills, one made of gold and the other of silver, the golden one worth some 3,800 castellanos (about 126 pounds of gold). As Velasquez was asking for them to be punished with death, and they were asking to be rewarded for their efforts in expanding the Spanish Empire (and bringing gold and silver), the Council of Indies decided to postpone both punishment and reward until proper investigation. That was precisely the outcome that Cortes was hoping for. During his visit to the Spanish court, Puertocarrero was questioned by Peter Martyr d'Anghiera, a member of the Council of Indies, together with Francisco de Montejo and Anton de Alaminos about the conquest of Mexico. He is mentioned by name in the Martyr's history De orbo novo (published in 1521) as the primary source for information on the early part of Hernán Cortés's expedition (conquest of Cozumel and Potonchan and Battle of Centla), which form The Fourth Decade of the book.

=== Death ===
According to Bernal Diaz del Castillo, he was thrown into prison by the bishop of Burgos, where he ended his days shortly after.
