= Hernández de Córdoba expedition =

1517 Spanish maritime voyage

- Córdoba's two caravels may have been similar to Cortés's in 1519 (shown)
- Sponsor: Francisco Hernández de Córdoba; Cristóbal Morante; Lope Ochoa de Caicedo; Diego Velázquez de Cuéllar
- Country: Spanish Cuba
- Leader: Francisco Hernández de Córdoba
- Start: Havana (Note: Accepted; other Cuban port (like Santiago) or February 1517 date possible.); 8 February 1517
- End: Cuba; April 1517
- Goal: To capture Bay or Lucayan islanders for enslavement (Note: Probable goal.); To discover new territory for annexation (Note: Purported (and possible) goal.)
- Ships: 2 caravels, (Note: At least one of the caravels was 70 to 80 tons.) 1 brigantine
- Crew: > 110 men (Note: As 110 combatant men, plus some unreported number of non-combatant Spanish and native Cuban crew (the latter pressed or hired), and pressed Maya crew (at least two).)
- Survivors: > 50 men (Note: As 54 combatant men, plus all or most of the non-combatant crew.)
- Achievements: First non-Amerindian contact with the Maya civilization (Note: Disputed; see in scholarship herein for overview.); Non-Amerindian discovery of the Yucatán Peninsula

Route

The Hernández de Córdoba expedition (Note: Also Córdoba or Cordoba for Hernández de Córdoba, as in.) was a Spanish maritime voyage to the northern Yucatán Peninsula, in the Maya Lowlands, led by Francisco Hernández de Córdoba in early 1517. The campaign was authorized by Diego Velázquez de Cuéllar, governor of Spanish Cuba, in 1516, and likely set out to kidnap Amerindian islanders of the Lucayan or Bay archipelagos for enslavement in newly found Cuban encomiendas, though discovery of uncharted territory may have been a further aim. Hernández de Córdoba failed to do the former, so the trip proved little profitable for the vecinos of Spanish Cuba who had funded it, but the expedition was nonetheless deemed an immediate success for meeting its secondary objective, as the company brought back reports of vast lands inhabited by a rich and advanced people, namely, the Maya civilization. The voyage is commonly regarded as the peninsula's non-Amerindian discovery, and as the first contact between the Maya and an Old World people, though both achievements have been disputed in scholarly literature. It involved the first instance of armed conflict between the Maya and the Spanish, and so is considered a precursor campaign to the Spanish conquest of the Maya. Its findings prompted the Grijalva expedition in 1518, and this in turn led to the Cortés expedition in 1519, which notably morphed into the Spanish invasion of the Aztec Empire to 1521.

A number of historical sources provide accounts of the Hernández de Córdoba expedition, and generally agree on a broad outline, but disagree on various specific points or minutia, which are thus still debated in literature today. Broadly speaking though, the Spanish company first landed in Ekab and then in Kanpech, both Postclassic Maya polities in northern Yucatán, and were twice made welcome. Presuming their luck would hold, and in need of fresh water, they next called at Chanputun, main port of an eponymous polity. Here, the thirsty expeditioners were emphatically not welcome, such that their continued presence quickly devolved into open hostilities, during which half the men were killed and the rest seriously wounded. This disastrous loss brought the Spanish expedition to a close, and is noted in popular culture as an early instance of Maya resistance to Spanish rule.

== Background ==
The conquest of Cuba in 1511 decimated the Indigenous population, and as survivors fled to inaccessible mountains, the Spanish had few tributary slaves for their encomiendas (1512 execution of cacique Hatuey shown) (Note: Per Bartolomé de las Casas in his Brevísima relación de la destrucción de las Indias.)

Towards the middle years of the 1510s, Spanish colonies in the New World dotted only a few of the Antilles and some mainland coast in the southern Caribbean. The conquistadors who peopled these early settlements generally led a life of deprivations though, having not yet found that which had been promised since the earliest Columbian voyages, namely, a western maritime route to the East Indies, scores of Amerindian slaves and tributaries for their encomiendas, and above all, copious amounts of gold. The first had proven elusive, and the second and last scarce, as the territory the Spanish then controlled lacked rich gold seams for fruitful mining, whereas their mere contact (via virgin soil epidemics) and warfare (via mass killings) invariably decimated pre-existing populations, leaving the conquistadors relatively few subjects for encomienda.

In 1516, three wealthy vecinos of Spanish Cuba, namely Francisco Hernández de Córdoba, Cristóbal Morante and Lope Ochoa de Caicedo, being apparently short on tribute or labour in their estates, resolved to outfit a slaving expedition to the Lucayan (just off northern Cuba) or to the Bay (far southwest of Cuba) islands. Each vecino reportedly contributed between 1,500 and 2,000 castellanos (Note: See castellano (moneda).) for the undertaking, while Diego Velázquez de Cuéllar further contributed a small brigantine and the needed authorisation as governor of the Spanish province with jurisdiction. With Hernández de Córdoba named captain, the organizers then enlisted Bernardino Íñiguez as veedor, (Note: A 'government official authorised to conduct administrative or judicial inquiries'. See veedor.) Alonso González as chaplain, a certain Morales as notary, and Antón de Alaminos, Camacho de Triana and Juan Álvarez as pilots, along with a further number of Spanish conquistadors. They also secured two larger caravels, hired the necessary crew (Spanish and Amerindian islanders), and outfitted and victualled the flotilla, such that it was readied for departure by early 1517.

== Expedition ==
There are quite a few primary and secondary sources on the Córdoba expedition, but they agree only on the broad strokes of the campaign, and of those that provide particular details (only some do), they rather fail to agree on said points, or even contradict each other on them. This is the case, for instance, for the flotilla's departure from Cuba. Most accounts agree that this occurred in 1517, but only the crónicas de Indias of Bartolomé de las Casas (a second-hand account) and Bernal Díaz del Castillo (a first-hand account) date it to February, and only the latter fixes a precise date, saying Córdoba departed from Havana on 8 February. According to Castillo, Córdoba hugged the Cuban coast for twelve days, until reaching the island's westernmost point at Cape San Antón, from where they put out to sea on 20 or 21 February.

At this point though, historical sources differ greatly. All accounts agree that the flotilla now crossed the Yucatán Channel, (unknowingly) heading towards the northeastern part of the Yucatán Peninsula, which at the time was encompassed by Ekab, a Postclassic province (kuchkabal) of the northern Maya Lowlands. Some say this bearing had been fixed prior to departure, while some claim it had not been. And of the latter, some say the ships came upon a storm which blew them off course and into the channel, but others assign blame to strong currents, whereas the rest report that the flotilla was intentionally steered into the channel when Córdoba decided to deviate from their predetermined course. The Spanish expeditioners did, in any case, sail southwest from San Antón, and sighted land in four, six, 21 or 40 days. Castillo, the only chronicler to report precise dates, claims a treacherous crossing of 21 days, such that Córdoba would have reached the peninsula on 13 or 14 March. That said, Castillo also reports 4 March as the date when five dugout canoes, crewed by Maya rowers, approached from Cape Catoche to meet the Spanish at their nearby anchorage, such that Córdoba must have arrived by 3 or 4 March at the latest. Given such uncertainty, historian Fernando Tola de Habich favours an arrival to the peninsula simply "in the first days of March 1517".

=== Northern prong ===
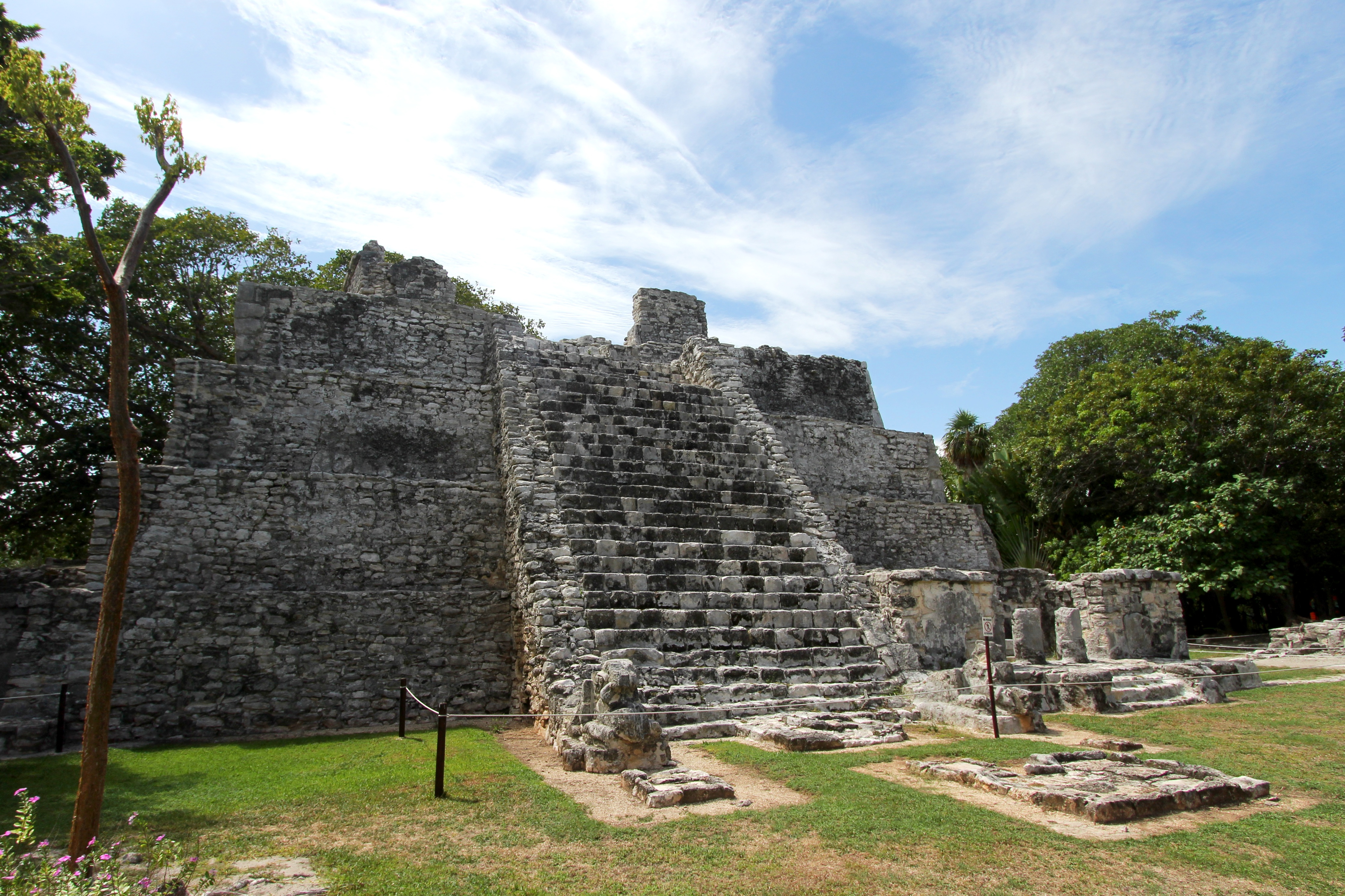
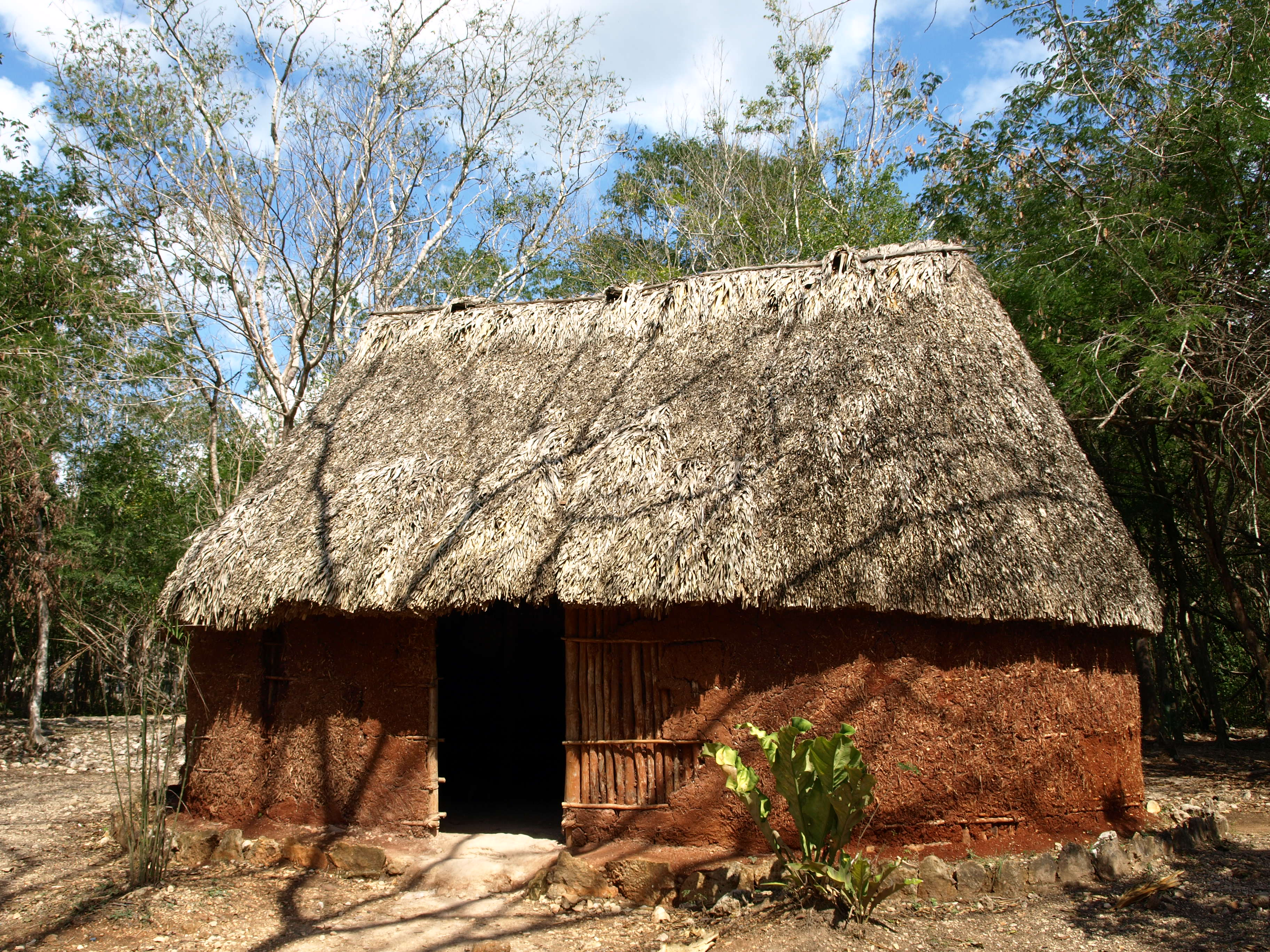
The Ekab settlement near Catoche (Cairo) may have been the first in the New World to more closely resemble Spanish ideas of "civilized" life. Its Late Postclassic temple (top) and lower- (middle) and upper-class (bottom) residences may have looked like those depicted. (Note: Top: Late Postclassic ruins of temple El Castillo in El Meco, now Cancún, Quintana Roo. Middle: modern replica of a traditional Maya commoner's house (in the Lowlands; missing some daub and limewash) in Chichén Itzá, Yucatán. Bottom: Late Postclassic ruins of elite residence House of the Great Lord in Tulum, now Tulum, Quintana Roo. In the 1510s, El Meco and Tulum may have been working fishing ports in northern Ekab, while common residences in the province may not have differed much from Lowland tradition (a single room, on a limestone plinthe, of wattle and daub, with rounded walls, a single doorway, no windows, thatched roofs, plastered lime floors, limewashed walls).)

As with details regarding their Cuban departure, there is likewise much disagreement among historical sources regarding the Córdoba expedition's exact point of arrival in the northeastern portion of the Yucatán Peninsula, in northern Ekab. Tola de Habich favours an approach to some northeastern cape on the mainland, rejecting as most improbable accounts of an initial stop in a nearby island, in Eccampi, in the province of Yucatán, and a non-stop coasting direct to Campeche from the Yucatán Channel. To them, the northeastern headland which Córdoba first sighted and approached was probably either Catoche, the unidentified Punta de Yucatán, or else the unidentified Punta Mujeres, where this last point is singled out as likeliest. At any rate, it is certain that the men first approached the northeast part of the peninsula, then disembarked at Catoche in northern Ekab, and then coasted westwards, rounded Punta Boxcohuo (Note: The northwesternmost point of the peninsula, in modern Celestún, Yucatán.) to enter the Bay of Campeche, and finally reached Campeche, port capital of the Kanpech province.

Again, as with details regarding their arrival to Yucatán, what exactly took place between first approach and Campeche is uncertain. According to Tola de Habich, Córdoba likely landed at Punta Mujeres and there came upon "a small salt-harvesting town, perhaps abandoned, where they found a small Maya temple with golden figurines of goddesses; from here they surely espied a larger town at some nearby headland, which prompted the fleet towards it: this was the town called Cairo by Peter Martyr, an appellation repeated by Castillo in his chronicle, adding the adjective Gran". The historian situates Gran Cairo in Catoche, and describes the momentous encounter between civilizations as follows. Gran Cairo "was also a small salt-harvesting town with some thatched, limestone houses, a temple, a minuscule pyramid, and a few clothed men, women, and children, who would have been flabbergasted at the coastal approach of strange ships from which disembarked a people so foreign in appearance, clothing, and language. It was an encounter worthy of astonishment for the Spaniards [too] because of the new things they now discovered of the New World, having prior known only of the simple and rustic life of the inhabitants of the Antilles and of the Caribbean coast of South America".

Accounts of the Córdoba company's time in Gran Cairo are quite varied; nevertheless, a few common threads emerge, including a chance encounter with local fishermen, a stroll through the settlement to observe its novel ways and means (gold ornaments, masonry buildings, monumental temples and pyramids, and so on), and "shock or awe at what the Spanish saw". Particularly notable here is the anecdote regarding the toponym Yucatán, purportedly uttered by locals (in Yucatec) to mean 'we do not understand you' when the expeditioners asked them (in Spanish) what they called their land. At this point, Córdoba is thought to have pressed two Gran Cairo fishermen for service, christened Melchor (Note: Also Melchorejo.) and Julián (Note: Also Julianillo.) by the newcomers. Their crew thus augmented, there was now reportedly talk of returning to Cuba to prepare a stronger fleet, as after Gran Cairo, their task now loomed large and forbidding compared to what they had expected, but "their curiosity got the better of them, as well as their hope of finding more gold and, undoubtedly, the sense that they had nothing to lose" (in Tola de Habich's words). And so, from Catoche, the flotilla set off along the shore to the west, encountering no resistance, and possibly no other coastal towns either, coasting along the Chik'in Che'el, K'in Ch'el, Kehpech, Chak'an and Kanul provinces (in that order).

=== Western prong ===
Chanputun skirmish (Note: Also Battle of Champoton. Also Batalla de Champotón, Batalla de la Mala Pelea, batalla de la Bahía de la Mala Pelea in Spanish.)
- Part of Spanish colonization of the Americas
- Maya captives taken after battle (Note: Per the Thomas Gann interpretation of a non-extant Late Postclassic (14th to 15th century) mural in Santa Rita, a Chetumal port in the 1510s. All figures are shown in profile. They all wear elaborate headdresses and jewellery, indicating upper-class status.) (Note: Here, the two figures on the left (labelled 6, 7) have their wrists bound by a white rope. The next figure (labelled 8) takes this rope over his shoulder and passes it onto the rightmost figure (labelled 9), who takes and holds the reins. This last figure is perched on an animal, possibly a gibnut.)
Date	March or April 1517
Location	Chanputun 19.3594°N 90.7235°W
Result	Chanputun victory

Belligerents
Chanputun	Columbian Viceroyalty; Spanish Cuba

Commanders and leaders
Moch Couoh (Note: Also named Moch-Couoh. Also surnamed Cohuó, Kowoj, Ko'woj.)	Francisco Hernández de Córdoba (DOW)

Strength
Hundreds (Note: Likely; many to 33,000 men reported.)	110 men (Note: Likely; 100 to 110 men possible. Excludes non-combatant Spanish and native Cuban crew (latter pressed or voluntary), and pressed Maya crew (at least two).)

Casualties and losses
few (Note: Likely; 'few casualties reported.); 2–5 captured	55 killed (Note: Likely; 20 to 57 possible. Excluding fatal casualties among the crew (possibly).); 52 wounded (Note: Likely; 30 to over 50 possible. Excluding non-fatal casualties among the crew (possibly).); 2 captured (Note: Likely; 1 to 2 possible.)

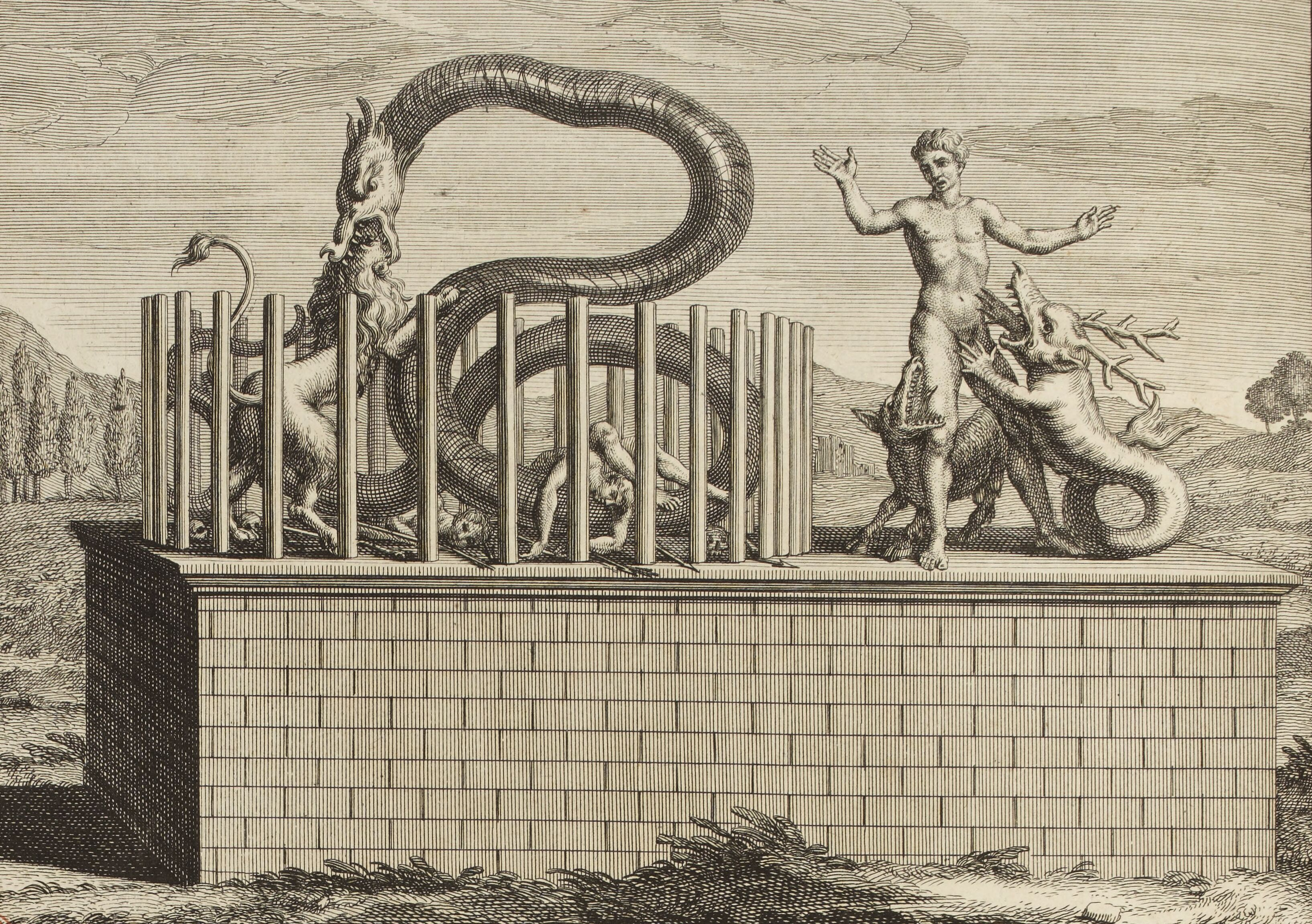
Córdoba's men reported seeing a monstruous, monumental idol in Campeche (artist's visualization shown), adding that it had been soaked in blood or strewn with human remains (Note: This 1723 Bernard Picart etching was based on said Spanish reports.)

A Maya captive (middle) before K'uk'ulkan (right) after a battle (14th to 15th century mural) (Note: Here, the middle figure is bound on a platform (possibly as torture or punishment), with an apparent shoulder injury. The right figure is identified as K'uk'ulkan by his characteristic profile, plus the feathered serpent he holds, and the two coiled around him.)

The westward leg from Catoche took 15 days (per Castillo) or 110 nautical leguas (Note: Reckoned at some 5 1/2 kilometres per nautical legua in. By this conversion, 110 nautical leguas would be 605 km (some 326 nautical miles); 10–15 would be 55–83 km (some 30–45 natical miles).) (per Martyr), and saw the Córdoba expedition reach Campeche on the día de san Lázaro (Note: lit. 'day of saint Lazarus'.) (per all historical sources), which possibly fell on 29 March in 1517. Their reception in the said Kanpech port is variously described though. To Tola de Habich, a cordial or even admiring welcome seems likely, with residents and the batab (cacique Lázaro to the Spanish) probably coming up to shore to witness the caravels and brigantine enter their harbour, and the Spanish no doubt seizing the moment with a grand gun salute for their audience. Upon dropping anchor, the captain and either a small number or all of his men (officers or combatant conquistadors) boarded ship's boats to come ashore, leaving the (non-combatant) crew behind on the vessels, as per custom then.

Córdoba and his men disembarked and found in Campeche a large port town of, reportedly, close to 3,000 houses, presumably of limestone, in addition to at least one temple and some shrines, and perhaps a small pyramid. As with their arrival, however, accounts of the voyage are not fully agreed on the details of the expeditioners' first night in town, though they do broadly agree that they were banqueted by local authorities, and that they were given a tour of a local temple. The welcome feast is said to have been a grand affair of multiple courses, heavy on fowl (notably ocellated turkey), game, maize and seasonal fruits, though curiously light on fish, greens and beverages. Having dined and rested to their hearts' content, the Spanish were then apparently invited to tour what would have been Campeche's most important site, its main (or only) temple. Tola de Habich quotes Casas and others (Note: Castillo, Martyr and Francisco López de Gómara.) "to get a clear idea of what they saw and what it meant to them", saying as follows. In the temple (or en route to it), the Córdoba company "saw a tower or tower-like structure, squared, made of stone and whitewashed, with stairs ... Atop sat a large idol with two lions or tigers which seemed to devour the idol by the flanks, and a serpent or animal of over 40 feet long and as wide as a thick ox which swallowed a fierce lion; all stone very well carved. Everything was awash in the blood of men who had been executed or sacrificed there". The tour would likely have occasioned a repeat of the shock and awe the Catholic men first experienced in Gran Cairo, says Tola de Habich, though this time more so tinged with fear or dread, given the "demonic" statuary and purported indications of fatal human sacrifice, possibly their first brush with such practices. In spite of this, the Spaniards sojourned a few days in Campeche, possibly prompted by their hosts' hospitality, and thereafter continued on their way.

The Córdoba flotilla then coasted due south for some ten or fifteen nautical leguas, and next sighted a port town which is variously called Moscobo, Champotón, Nochopobón and Potonchán in historical sources. Historians since have most often identified this place as either Potonchán (on Río Grijalva in Chontal territory then, west of Laguna de Términos, site of modern Frontera, Tabasco) or Champotón (on Río Champotón in the Chanputun province, east of Términos, site of modern Champotón, Campeche), but geographer José N. Iturriaga recently argued that only the latter is correct. Upon spying the river, the Spanish company reportedly all boarded the brigantine and boats, with their arms and pipas ('barrels or casks') for fresh water, being apparently much dehydrated by this point, and again left the crew behind on the two larger ships (caravels), which were anchored about one nautical legua offshore. Ensuing events onshore though, as narrated in historical sources, are "very strange and on many points quite incomprehensible". Nevertheless, Tola de Habich accepts the following series of events as most likely.

Once on land, the Córdoba expeditioners, used to kindly receptions at Punta Mujeres, Catoche and Campeche, were now rather coldly received by armed locals who indicated that they were most certainly not welcome. The Spanish men, "stubborn" but in dire need of drinking water, disembarked regardless and set to sating their thirst and filling their pipas at the riverbank. Nightfall apparently crept up on the landed party, forcing them to bivouac ashore for what must have been a tense night under the watchful eye of their aggrieved hosts. The men next awakened at dawn to a growing audience of a great many locals dressed for battle, "with cotton armour (Note: Akin to Aztec ichcahuipilli.) down to their knees, and bows and arrows, and spears and bucklers, and swords like two-handed montantes, and slingshots and stones, and plumes of the kind they usually don, and their faces masked in black and white", according to Castillo. War drums now beat in their periphery, accompanied by a great roar, and an opening salvo of arrows and stones from all sides. Frenzied combat ensued, reportedly amidst the local war captain's shouted orders of al calachoni, meaning 'target the [Spanish] captain'. Within "little more than half an hour", Córdoba, grievously wounded, seeing nearly half his men fallen, a few captured and little more than half alive but just as injured as him, called for an immediate retreat. The survivors now rushed seawards to their beached brigantine and boats, the locals in dogged pursuit even into sea.

The captain and his surviving company managed to reach the safety of their large caravels, whereupon the full weight of their loss dawned on them, namely (per Castillo, whose figures Tola de Habich accepts): 55 men killed, 2 captured, (Note: Alonso Boto and El portugués viejo.) 52 wounded, (Note: All but one of the survivors.) an unreported number of crew casualties, (Note: Fatal or otherwise; of Spanish, native Cuban or Maya crewmates.) and all their pipas of drinking water lost. The short but brutal engagement in Champotón "was a vicious carnage ... the Spaniards' most catastrophic military defeat yet since arriving in the New World", as Tola de Habich put it. Now in dire straits and unable to man both caravels and the brigantine, a wounded Córdoba had the latter scuttled, and, with great effort, the much-decimated expedition put out to sea aboard the larger ships.

=== Return ===
Most historical sources say the Córdoba expedition made a beeline for Cuba, which account Tola de Habich favours, but Castillo reports that the flotilla of two caravels first stopped at an unidentified Estero de los Lagartos for much needed fresh water, and finding none, were next led to Florida by pilot Alaminos, from where they finally made the return trip to Cuba, after a native Floridian attack (though they had reportedly, at last, found drinking water). As with their initial departure from said island though, there are likewise precious few details regarding the company's final return. According to Tola de Habich, what is certain is that both ships made port sometime in April 1517, whereupon Córdoba debriefed governor Velázquez, thus bringing the short but trying voyage to a close.

== Aftermath ==
Though Velázquez was named adelantado of Yucatán in 1518, the Maya Lowlands were rather conquered by Francisco de Montejo from 1526, whose men were accused of barbarities involving their dogs of war (shown)

Córdoba died shortly upon returning to his home in Sancti Spíritus in April 1517, probably from wounds or other injuries sustained during his expedition, particularly during the ambush at Champotón. The rest of his surviving company are thought to have spent a considerable amount of time convalescing from their own comparable injuries, such that only "a few" of them were able to join later voyages from Spanish Cuba to the Maya Lowlands and farther west.

In Santiago, expeditionary reports of lands of "greater wealth, organization, and social and material development" (than heretorfore known in the expanding Columbian Viceroyalty) apparently thrilled governor Velázquez, who immediately got to work commissioning and outfitting a follow up trip to the new-found territory, namely the Grijalva expedition by Juan de Grijalva, which set off in early 1518 and notably returned with news of the rich and powerful Aztec Empire. Velázquez was also quick to claim credit for Córdoba's geographic findings (a discovery to the Spanish), and successfully petitioned the Spanish crown to be named adelantado of Yucatán, granted him on 13 November 1518 in Zaragoza, by which letters patent he was authorized to conquer and settle the said peninsula (according to Spanish law, in any case).

Meanwhile, in the Maya Lowlands, at "about the time of the Córdoba expedition a new and terrible disease devastated the peninsula. It was almost certainly smallpox, perhaps introduced by the expedition, though there is nothing to suggest that in the records, or by some forgotten victims of shipwreck, or brought by a long chain of Indian carriers from Panama", according to historian Inga Clendinnen.

== Legacy ==
Córdoba is thought to have "opened the doors" to Mesoamerica, as his trip spurred further expeditions westwards from Spanish Cuba, and soon led Cortés to Tenochtitlan (artist's reconstruction shown), which fell to him in 1521

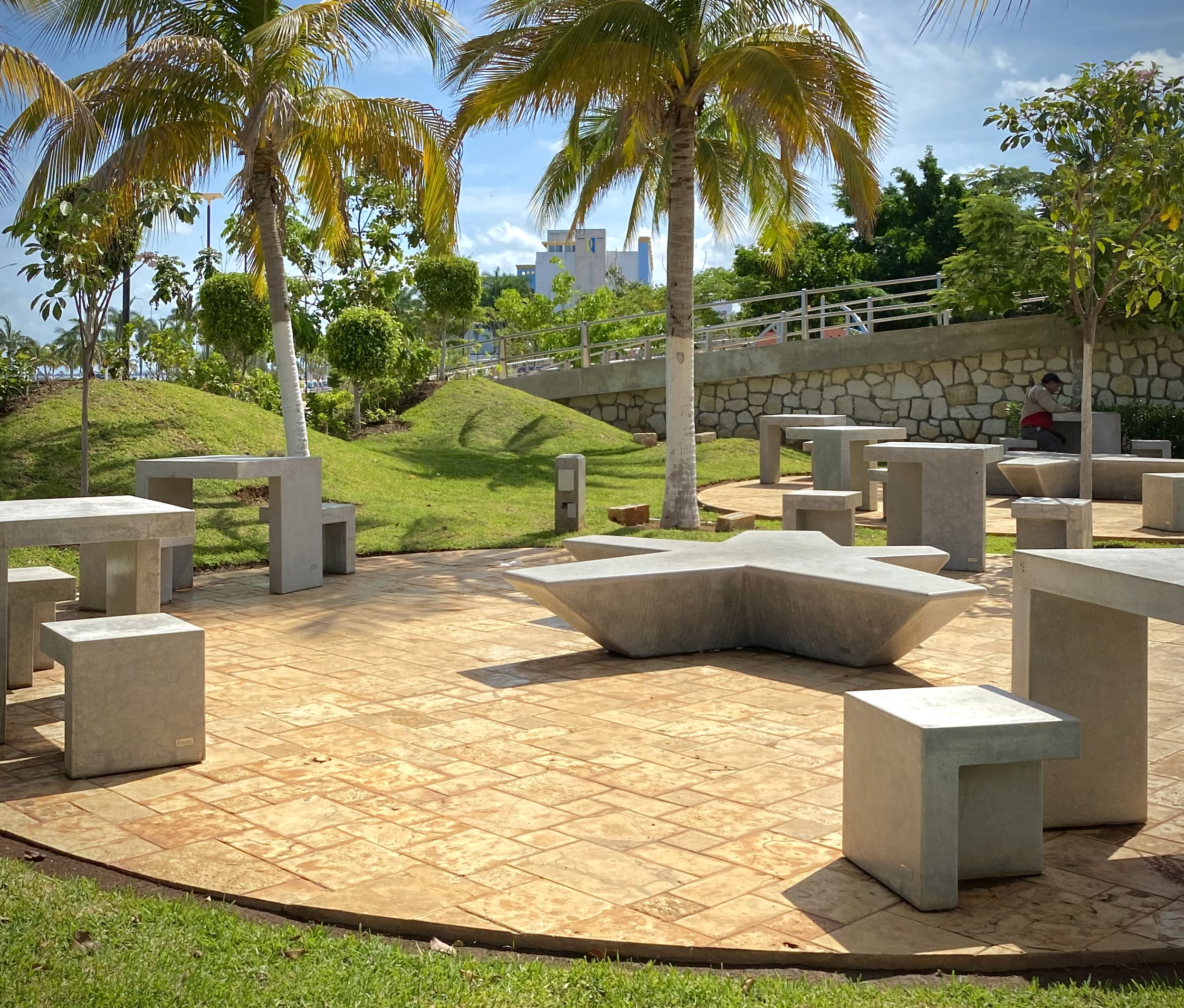
Seaside park in modern Campeche, named Parque de Moch Couoh (lit. 'Park of Moch Couoh') after the 1510s batab

Bronze of a 16th century Maya lancer (unarmoured) in modern Champotón, Campeche, possibly depicting Moch Couoh

In historical scholarship since the 16th century, the accounts of the Córdoba expedition by Castillo and Casas have been the most influential, though their preferential status has been more recently called into question, for instance, by Tola de Habich, who describes them as "the most outlandish" of primary or secondary sources on the voyage. The trip report in Castillo's Historia verdadera de la conquista de la Nueva España nevertheless remains the most cited in modern literature, though it is now often qualified. For instance, it is followed by Tola de Habich (to an extent), Victoria Ojeda (mostly), and Clendinnen (mostly).

In a similar vein, quite a few of the campaign's details, often repeated with certitude, have now come under scholarly scrutiny. For example, the point in northeastern Yucatán that the flotilla first sighted is commonly said to have been Isla Mujeres, following the relevant account by chronicler Francisco López de Gómara, where the point of arrival is identified as "a punta which he [Córdoba] named de las Mujeres". But Tola de Habich rejects the inferential jump from the said punta to the eponymous island, arguing that Gómara and other reporters clearly meant to refer to some mainland (not insular) headland, possibly Punta Mujeres or Cape Catoche. Similarly, Victoria Ojeda follows historian Marshall H. Saville in rejecting Isla Mujeres, deeming Catoche as the likelier point of first landing. In addition to this, the expedition's objective is variously said to have been either slaving in the Lucayan or Bay islands, or else geographic discovery to the uncharted (by the Spanish) west. Tola de Habich considers the former "the most probable and supported" by evidence, but concedes that the latter may well have been a secondary aim; Victoria Ojeda makes a similar assessment. Lastly, since Castillo's chronicle, the site of the campaign's Hispano–Maya clash has been discordantly identified as Potonchán (on Río Grijalva) or Champotón (on Río Champotón), with either port town indiscriminately referred to as Potonchán or Champotón. Iturriaga resolves the mix up in favour of the second port, concluding that the first is a misidentification due to toponymic similarity.

Both achievements credited to the Córdoba expedition have been disputed. For instance, while it is popularly regarded as the (non-Amerindian) discovery of the Yucatán Peninsula, Victoria Ojeda notes that the feat ought to more properly be attributed to the Pinzón–Solís voyage of 1508 to 1509, or to the Guerrero–Aguilar stranding of 1511. Tola de Habich makes a similar observation, and further takes the Peter Martyr map as provisional evidence in support of crediting the earlier trip. In contrast though, the 1562 Chronicle of Chac Xulub Chen, by Maya chronicler Ah Nakuk Pech, seemingly attributes non-Amerindian discovery to the later event (stranding). As regards Córdoba's second achievement, that of first contact (non-Amerindian) with the Maya civilization, Tola de Habich and Clendinnen instead attribute it either to the Honduran leg of the fourth Columbian voyage of 1502 to 1504, or to the aforementioned stranding of 1511. All that considered, the former historian concludes their analysis by underlining the importance of Córdoba's campaign, which "opened the doors" to Mesoamerica, and thus led to the conquest of the Aztec (immediately) and of the Maya (later on).

=== In culture ===
In the decades following the Córdoba expedition, and in a process similar to that which later led to El Dorado, the small fishing port of Gran Cairo is said to have attained mythic proportions in the collective imagination of Spanish colonists, becoming a vast city "five times greater than Paris", dotted with "many rich palaces". Victoria Ojeda attributes this simply to the novel sense of astonishment the settlement occasioned amongst the expeditioners. Similarly, after the voyage, the Spanish are said to have thought that Yucatán formed a great island (not peninsula), stretching from Ascension Bay (Note: See Bahía de la Ascensión.) (in the east) to Laguna de Términos (west), possibly due to incomplete intelligence from pilot Alaminos. The misconception naturally found its way onto Spanish (and later European) charts, and was not corrected until the newcomers made more thorough surveys of the abutting Gulf of Mexico and Bay of Honduras in later decades. In a similar vein, in the northern Maya Lowlands, Victoria Ojeda suggests that the trip may have been interpreted by chilams ('Maya priests') as fulfilment of prophecies foretelling the arrival of bearded men, which omen was said to augur times of "weeping skies, scarcity of corn, and great hunger".

The 500th anniversary of the Córdoba expedition, in 2017, was commemorated with a number of celebrations throughout the peninsula and Mexico, including in Campeche, Cancún, Isla Mujeres, and Mexico City. The 400th anniversary was commemorated by the federal government of Mexico via the 1917 dedication of a public monument in Isla Mujeres.

== Lists ==
The following is a list of known officers or crewmates in the company of the Hernández de Córdoba expedition.

- Hernando de Aguilar
- Antón de Alaminos, pilot (Note: Participated in the later Grijalva or Cortés expeditions.)
- Juan Álvarez, pilot (Note: Also nicknamed El Manquillo.)
- Juan de Aragón
- Pedro de Ávila
- Gaspar de Ávila Quiñones (Note: Also surnamed Dávila Quiñónez.)
- Benito de Béjar
- Alonso de Benavides
- Juan Bernal
- Bernardino, sailor (Note: Purportedly levantisco ('insubordinate or Levantine').)
- Berrio (Note: Captured in Florida.)
- Alonso Boto (Note: Captured in Champotón.)
- Pedro Camacho, pilot (Note: Also surnamed Camacho de Triana, as in.)
- Benito de Cuenca (Note: Participated in the later Grijalva or Narváez expeditions.)
- Bernal Díaz del Castillo
- Nicolás de Gibraltar
- Alonso González, cleric
- Alonso Guisado (Note: Their participation in this expedition may be uncertain.)
- Cristóbal Hernández de Alanís (Note: Also surnamed Hernández de Mosquera, H. de Alanis, H. de la Puebla.)
- Francisco Hernández de Córdoba, captain
- Pedro Hernández Sevillano (Note: Also named Pedro Hernández.)
- Bernardino Íñiguez, veedor (Note: Post in.)
- Alonso de Jerez
- Diego López
- Francisco López (Note: Participated in the later Grijalva expedition, purportedly.)
- Pedro López Marroqué
- Ginés Martín
- Morales, scribe
- Alonso de Ojeda (Note: Their participation in this expedition was prior uncertain.) (Note: Captured Xicotencatl II, purportedly.)
- Alonso Ortiz de Zúñiga (Note: Participated in the later Grijalva (likely) or Narváez (purportedly) expeditions.)
- Pedro de Ovide
- Juan Pérez de Ardón (Note: Also named Juan Peréz, possibly.)
- Pedro de Toledo Perón
- Diego de Porras (Note: Participated in the later Cortés expedition, purportedly.)
- Cindo de Portillo (Note: A friar. Also named Cinco de Villasinda. The same person as Cintos de San Francisco, possibly.)
- El portugués viejo (Note: For 'the old Portuguese man'. Captured in Champotón. A Portuguese man.)
- Pedro Prieto
- Martín Ramos de Lares
- Juan Ruiz de Alaniz (Note: Cousin of Cristóbal Hernández de Alaniz, purportedly.)
- Cintos de San Francisco (Note: A friar. The same person as Cindo de Portillo, possibly. Later returned to New Spain with the Marquis of the Valley of Oaxaca, purportedly.)
- San Juan (Note: Also nicknamed El Entonado or San Juan de Uchila, possibly.)
- Martín Vázquez
- Vivanco (Note: Participated in later expeditions to New Spain.)
- Miguel Zaragoza

The following table lists particular details of the Hernández de Córdoba expedition, as given in eight 16th century accounts of the trip. From left to right, the accounts covered below are those of some members of the company of the Cortés expedition in 1519, of Bartolomé de las Casas, Bernal Díaz del Castillo, Francisco López de Gómara, Peter Martyr of Angleria, Gonzalo Fernández de Oviedo, Francisco Cervantes de Salazar, and Juan Ginés de Sepúlveda.

Concordance among select historical sources regarding select aspects of the Hernández de Córdoba expedition.
	Company (Note: Particulars according to some members of the Cortés expeditionary company in 1519.)	Casas (Note: Particulars according to Bartolomé de las Casas.)	Castillo (Note: Particulars according to Bernal Díaz del Castillo.)	Gómara (Note: Particulars according to Francisco López de Gómara.)	Martyr (Note: Particulars according to Peter Martyr of Angleria.)	Oviedo (Note: Particulars according to Gonzalo Fernández de Oviedo.)	Salazar (Note: Particulars according to Francisco Cervantes de Salazar.)	Sepúlveda (Note: Particulars according to Juan Ginés de Sepúlveda.)
Who organized the expedition?	Córdoba, Morante, Caicedo and Velázquez	Córdoba, Morante and Caicedo	the company of 110 men	Córdoba, Morante and Caicedo	Córdoba, Morante and Caicedo	Córdoba, Morante and Caicedo	either Córdoba, Morante and Caicedo, or only Velázquez	Córdoba, Morante and Caicedo
Was the expedition authorized by Velázquez and him only?	—	Yes	—	—	—	Yes	Yes	Yes
Did Velázquez put up a brigantine?	—	—	Yes	Yes	—	—	Yes	—
Was the fleet composed of two ships and a brigantine?	Yes	Yes	Yes	Yes	Yes	Yes	Yes	Yes
Was the company handpicked by the organizers? (Note: Was their habilitación ('authorisation to join the expedition') by or due to the organizers?)	—	Yes	—	Yes	Yes	Yes	—	Yes
Was Córdoba captain?	Yes	Yes	Yes	Yes	Yes	Yes	Yes	Yes
Was Íñiguez veedor?	—	—	Yes	Yes	Yes	Yes	Yes	—
Who piloted the vessels?	Alaminos	Alaminos	Alaminos, Camacho and Álvarez	Alaminos	Alaminos	Alaminos	Alaminos	possibly Alaminos
Was González chaplain?	—	—	Yes	—	—	—	—	—
How large was the company?	104 men	100 men	110 men	110 men	110 men	110 men	110 men	110 men
Did the expedition intend to discover new lands, or to kidnap and enslave Amerindians?	for slaving only	for both discovery and slaving	for discovery only	for both discovery and slaving	for discovery only	possibly for one or the other only	possibly for both, or possibly slaving only	for discovery only
Did the expedition's objective change during the journey?	—	Yes	—	—	—	—	Yes	—
When did the expedition set off, and from which Cuban port?	1517, Santiago	February 1517, Santiago	8 February 1517, La Habana-Axaruco	1517, Santiago	not 1517	1517	1516, Santiago	1517, Santiago
What did the fleet do before entering the Yucatán Channel?	—	coast to Cape San Antón, cruise to explore	coast to Cape San Antón, cruise to explore, hit a storm, and set for the channel on 20 February	cruise to explore, and hit a storm	coast to Cape San Antón, and cruise to explore	coast southwest to Cape San Antón	cruise to explore, and hit a storm	coast west to Cape San Antón
Did the fleet arrive at the Yucatán Peninsula?	Yes	Yes	Yes	Yes	Yes	Yes	Yes	Yes
How was the fleet's Yucatán Channel crossing, and where in the Yucatán Peninsula did they arrive?	of 60–70 leguas to Punta de Yucatán	of 4 days over 70–80 leguas to Cozumel	of 21 days to Cotoche or Gran Cairo	to Punta de las Mujeres	of 66 leguas to Eccampi	of 66–70 leguas to Provincia de Yucatán	of 40 days to Punta de las Mujeres or Campeche	of 6 days to Provincia de Yucatán
What did the men note at their first Maya settlement?	white masonry houses and much gold	white masonry houses, clothed people and much gold	white masonry houses, clothed people and much gold	white masonry houses, clothed people and much gold	white masonry houses, clothed people and much gold	white masonry houses, clothed people and much gold	white masonry houses	white masonry houses, clothed people and much gold
What names did Córdoba give Cape Catoche and the Yucatán Peninsula?	Yucatán peninsula	cape Catoche	cape Catoche, but did not name the peninsula	cape Catoche and Yucatán peninsula	Yucatán peninsula	—	cape Catoche and Tectetán peninsula	—
What did the men do in Cape Catoche?	—	kidnap 1 Maya local	skirmish with Maya locals, and kidnap some	—	—	kidnap some Maya locals	—	—
From where and how did the fleet sail to Campeche?	from Punta de Yucatán	from Cozumel via an unnamed town and Cape Catoche	from Cape Catoche in 15 days	from Punta Mueres via Cape Catoche and an unnamed point	from Eccampi via Cairo over 110 leguas	from Provincia de Yucatán	from Punta Mueres via Cape Catoche and an unnamed point, or else from Cozumel sans stops	from Provincia de Yucatán
Did the fleet arrive at Campeche on domingo de Lázaro or día de san Lázaro?	Yes	Yes	Yes	Yes	Yes	Yes	Yes	Yes
Whom or what did Córdoba name Lázaro?	Campeche's mayor only	Campeche only	Campeche only	Campeche only	Campeche's mayor only	Campeche only	Campeche only	Campeche only
What did the men do upon arriving at Campeche?	landed, were unwelcome, and kidnapped some locals	landed, were welcomed, and kidnapped some locals	landed, were ambivalently received, and kidnapped some locals	landed, were welcomed, and kidnapped some locals	fired cannons, landed, were welcomed, and kidnapped some locals	fired cannons, landed and were welcomed	landed but kidnapped no one	fired cannons in salute or warning, landed and were welcomed
What did the men do in Campeche the evening of their landing?	—	were banqueted, toured a temple, saw human sacrifice signs	toured a temple, saw human sacrifice signs and "Christian" crosses	were banqueted, toured a temple, saw human sacrifice signs and "Christian" crosses	were banqueted, toured a temple, saw human sacrifice signs and "Christian" crosses	were banqueted and saw "Christian" crosses	—	were banqueted, saw human sacrifice signs and "Christian" crosses
Did the fleet arrive in Champotón?	Yes	Yes	Yes	Yes	Yes	Yes	Yes	Yes
How did the fleet sail to Champotón?	sailed 10 leguas to Nochopobón	sailed 10–12 leguas to Champotón	sailed 10 days north to Potonchan	—	sailed 15 leguas	sailed 15 leguas	sailed 9–10 leguas	sailed 60,000 pasos to Moscobo
Who received the men upon their landing at Champotón, and how?	were welcomed by mayor Champotón, but denied entry to town	were welcomed	were ambivalently received	were ill-received by mayor Mochocoboc	were ill-received by mayor Chiapetón	were ill-received by mayor Chiapotón	were ill-received by mayor	were ill-received
What did the men do in Champotón the evening of their landing?	slept ashore	slept ashore	slept ashore	were under locals' watch, away from the ships	were under locals' watch, away from the ships	were under locals' watch, away from the ships	were under locals' watch	were under locals' watch
Did Champotón ambush the men?	Yes	Yes	No	No	Yes	Yes	?	Yes
How did Champotón's ambush go?	locals attacked, killed 26 men, wounded survivors (Note: And wounded Córdoba.)	> 1,000 locals attacked, killed 20 men, wounded all or most survivors (Note: And dealt Córdoba over 30 wounds. Locals incurred many casualties.)	c. 33,000 locals came, > 55 men died, all but one survivors wounded, 2 men captured (Note: And Córdoba suffered ten wounds. There were circa 300 locals per Spaniard.)	locals came, men died, > 50 survivors wounded, 2 men captured (Note: And Córdoba was wounded.)	locals attacked, killed men, wounded most survivors	locals attacked, killed men, wounded > 30 survivors (Note: And wounded Córdoba. Locals incurred some casualties.)	many locals came, 2 to > 20 men died, all or > 50 survivors wounded (Note: And Córdoba suffered over 20 or 33 wounds.)	a great number of locals attacked, killed men, wounded 30 survivors
Did the fleet flee from Champotón to Cuba?	Yes	Yes	Yes	Yes	Yes	Yes	Yes	Yes
Where did the fleet stop on their way back to Cuba?	—	—	Estero de los Lagartos and Florida	—	—	—	Florida	—
Did Córdoba debrief Velázquez upon his return to Cuba?	Yes	Yes	Yes	Yes	Yes	Yes	Yes	Yes

== See also ==
- Spanish conquest of Yucatán
- List of battles won by Amerindians

== Notes and references ==
=== References ===
1. Barrera Vásquez A, Bastarrachea Manzano JR, Brito Sansores W, Vermont Salas R, Dzul Góngora D, Dzul Poot D, eds. (1980). Diccionario maya Cordemex : maya-español, español-maya (1st ed.). Merida: Ediciones Cordemex.
2. Chamberlain RS (1948). The Conquest and Colonization of Yucatan, 1517-1550. Publication. Vol. 582. Washington, DC: Carnegie Institution of Washington. hdl:2027/mdp.39015014584406. LCCN 48010986.
3. Clendinnen I (2003) [First published 1987 by Cambridge University Press]. Ambivalent Conquests: Maya and Spaniard in Yucatan, 1517-1570. Cambridge Latin American Studies. Vol. 61 (2nd ed.). Cambridge: Cambridge University Press. ISBN 0-521-82031-6. LCCN 2002191144.
4. Eatough G (1999). "Peter Martyr's Account of the First Contacts with Mexico". Viator. 30: 397–421. doi:10.1484/J.VIATOR.2.300843.
5. Gómez Martín JA (June 2013). "El descubrimiento del Yucatán". Revista de estudios colombinos. 9: 53–60. ISSN 1699-3926. Dialnet 4502253.
6. Iturriaga JN (January–June 2023). "¿Champotón o Potonchán? Del error geográfico al error histórico". Estudios de historia moderna y contemporánea de México. 65: 243–263. doi:10.22201/iih.24485004e.2023.65.77818. S2CID 254756963.
7. León Cázares MC, Conover Blancas C, eds. (2020). Encuentros y desencuentros en las costas del Yucatán (1517). Cuadernos del Centro de Estudios Mayas. Vol. 43. Ciudad de México: Universidad Nacional Autónoma de México. ISBN 978-607-30-3182-0. LCCN 2021398905. GB TNixEAAAQBAJ. Perlego 3854520.
8. Ortiz Lanz JE (2018). Las verdaderas historias del descubrimiento de la Nueva España: Las expediciones de Hernández de Córdova y Grijalva, 1517–1518. Ciudad de México: Cámara de Diputados, LXIII Legislatura; Pámpano Servicios Editoriales. BNM 000707478.
9. Saville MH (November 1918). "The Discovery of Yucatan in 1517 by Francisco Hernández de Córdoba". Geographical Review. 6 (5): 436–448. doi:10.2307/207701. JSTOR 207701.
10. Tola de Habich F (2018). Yucatán 1517: El segundo descubrimiento de América (Hernández de Córdoba). Viajeros; Colección sextante. Vol. 6. Mérida, Yucatán: Universidad Nacional Autónoma de México. ISBN 978-607-30-1074-0. LCCN 2019447521.
11. Victoria Ojeda J (2019). "El arribo de los españoles a la Peninsula de Yucatán y el inicio del cambio en el paisaje biocultural de la región, siglo XVI". Boletín americanista. 78: 175–195. ISSN 0520-4100. UB 22237.
12. Wagner HR, ed. (1942). The Discovery of Yucatan by Francisco Hernández de Córdoba: A Translation of the Original Texts with an Introduction and Notes. Documents and Narratives Concerning the Discovery and Conquest of Latin America; New Series. Vol. 1. Berkeley, California: Cortés Society. LCCN 42016589. OCLC 16731061.
