= Francisco Hernández de Córdoba (Yucatán conquistador) =

Conquistador, explorer

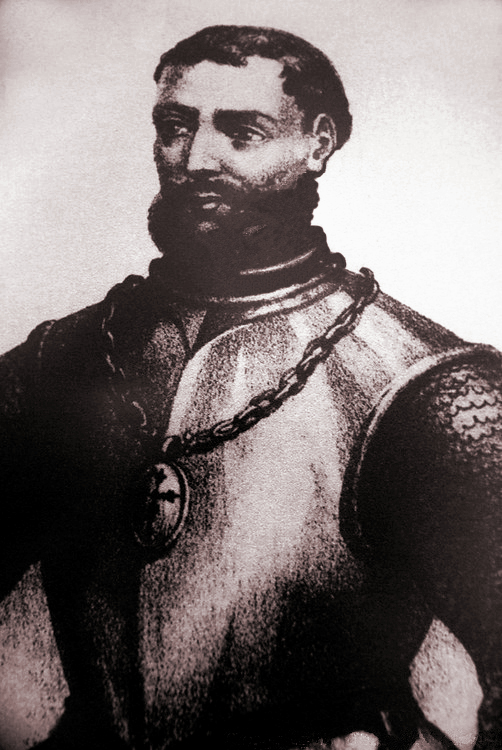
- A contemporary portrait of Francisco Hernández de Córdoba in the Museo Histórico Naval, Veracruz, Mexico
- Born: c. 1467; Córdoba, Spain
- Died: 1517; Sancti Spiritus, Cuba
- Occupation: Conquistador

Francisco Hernández de Córdoba (Spanish: [fɾanˈθisko eɾˈnandeθ ðe ˈkoɾðoβa]; c. 1467 in Córdoba – 1517 in Sancti Spíritus) was a Spanish conquistador from Córdoba, known for the ill-fated expedition he led in 1517, in the course of which the first European accounts of the Yucatán Peninsula were recorded. He died from wounds he suffered during the expedition after battling against Mayans.

== 1517 Expedition ==
Together with some 110 discontented Spanish settlers in early colonial Cuba, Hernández de Córdoba petitioned the governor, Diego Velázquez de Cuéllar, for permission to launch an expedition in search of new lands and exploitable resources. This permission was granted after some haggling over terms, and the expedition consisting of three ships under Hernández de Córdoba's command left the harbor of Santiago de Cuba on February 8, 1517, to explore the shores of southern Mexico. The main pilot was Antón de Alaminos, the premiere navigator of the region who had accompanied Christopher Columbus on his initial voyages; The pilots of the other two ships were Juan Álvarez and Camacho de Triana.

During the course of this expedition many of Hernández' men were killed, most during a battle near the town of Champotón against a Maya army. He himself was injured, and died a few days after his return to Cuba. Bernal Díaz del Castillo was a member of the expedition and wrote about his journey. This was the Europeans' first encounter with what they considered an "advanced civilization" in the Americas, with solidly built buildings and a complex social organization which they recognized as being comparable to those of the Old World. They also had reason to expect that this new land would have gold.

Little is known of Córdoba's life before his exploration of the Yucatán. A native of Spain, he was living in Cuba in 1517, indicating that he had participated in the conquest of the island. He was also quite wealthy, as he both owned a landed estate, including a native town, and financed his expedition to Mexico.

=== Origin of Hernández's expedition ===
Bernal Díaz del Castillo is the chronicler who gives the most detail about the voyage of Hernández de Córdoba; his is also the only first-person account by someone who was present for the entire process. Also, Bernal declares in his chronicle that he had been himself a promoter of the project, together with another hundred or so Spaniards who said they had to "occupy themselves". These soldiers and adventurers had been three years now in the newly settled territory of Cuba, many also having moved there from the colony of Castilla del Oro (Tierra Firme, present-day Panama) under its governor Pedrarias Dávila; they complained that "they hadn't done a single thing worth the telling".

From Bernal Díaz del Castillo's narrative, it appears possible to deduce — possibly against the narrator's own pretences because he would prefer to keep this hidden — that the original goal of the project was to capture Indians as slaves to increase or replace the manpower available to work the agricultural land or the mines of Cuba, and so that the Spaniards resident on the island who did not have Indians for their own exploitation of the land, such as Bernal himself, could establish themselves as hacendados.

Bernal tells first how he, like the other restless 110 Spaniards who lived in Castilla del Oro, decided to ask permission of Pedrarias to travel to Cuba, and that Pedrarias granted this willingly, because in Tierra Firme "there was nothing to conquer, that every thing was peaceful, that Vasco Núñez de Balboa, Pedrarias's son-in-law, had conquered it".

Those Spaniards from Castilla del Oro presented themselves in Cuba to Diego Velázquez, the governor (and relative of Bernal Díaz del Castillo), who promised them "...that he would give us Indians when some were available". Immediately after this allusion to the promise of Indians, Bernal writes, "And as three years had already passed [...] and we haven't done a single thing worth the telling, the 110 Spaniards who came from Darién and those who in the island of Cuba do not have Indians" — again an allusion to the lack of Indians — they decided to join up with "an hidalgo [a title of nobility or gentry, derived from hijo de algo, "son of someone"] known as Francisco Hernández de Córdoba [...] and that he was a rich man who had a village of Indians on this island [Cuba]", who had accepted to be their captain "to go on our venture to discover new lands and in them to employ ourselves".

Bernal Díaz del Castillo barely tries to conceal that the much-repeated Indians had something to do with the project, although authors such as Salvador de Madariaga prefer to conclude that the objective was a much more noble one, "to discover, to occupy ourselves and do things worthy of being told". But, in addition, governor Diego Velázquez himself wanted to participate in the project and he lent the money to build a boat, "...with the condition that [...] we had to go with three boats to some little islets that are between the island of Cuba and Honduras, that are now known as the islands of Los Guanaxes [Guanajes], and we had to go in arms and fill up the boats with a cargo of Indians from those islets to serve as slaves" (here Bernal uses the word esclavos, "slaves", against Velázquez, whereas he had previously avoided speaking of the Indians whom Velázquez had promised to him). The chronicler immediately denied that he admits this pretension of Velázquez's: "we responded to him that what he said was not the command of God nor king, to make free men into slaves". If we are to believe Bernal, the governor sportingly admitted the denial and despite all this lent the money for the boat.

To evaluate the vague and even contradictory form in which Bernal treats the matter of kidnapping Indians as a possible objective of the voyage, one must take into account that he wrote his history of the conquest some fifty years after the occurrence of these events, and that at least in part his objective was to have his services and those of his fellow soldiers recognized by the Crown. It would have been difficult in these circumstances for him to have clearly stated that this had originally been a slaving expedition.

Most of his contemporaries, who also wrote earlier, are less evasive: in the letter sent to Queen Joanna and Emperor Charles V (Charles I of Spain) by the constable and town authorities of la Rica Villa de la Vera Cruz, Cortés's captains narrate the origin of Hernández's expedition saying: "as it is the custom in those islands that in the name of your majesties are peopled with Spaniards to go for Indians to the islands that are not peopled with Spaniards, to obtain services from them [i.e. to obtain their forced labor], they sent the abovementioned... [Francisco Fernández de Córdoba and his associates Lope Ochoa de Caicedo and Cristobal Morante with]... two boats and a brigantine in order that from said islands they would bring Indians to the so-called Fernandina Island, and we think [...] that said Diego Velázquez [...] has the fourth part of said armada". In his Relación de las cosas de Yucatán ("Relation of the Things of Yucatán"), Fray Diego de Landa writes that Hernández de Córdoba went... "to gather slaves for the mines, now that in Cuba the population is getting smaller", although a while later he adds, "Others say that he left to discover land and that he brought Alaminos as a pilot..." Bartolomé de Las Casas also says that even if the original intent was to kidnap and enslave Indians, at some point the objective was broadened to one of discovery, which justifies Alaminos.

The presence of Antón de Alaminos on the expedition is, in effect, one of the arguments against the hypothesis that the objective was exclusively one of slaving. This prestigious pilot, veteran of the voyages of Columbus and even, according to some, a man knowledgeable of places not published on the mariners' maps, would seem an excessive resource for a slaving expedition to the Guanajes islets.

There was another member of the expedition whose presence conforms still less to this hypothesis: the Veedor ("Overseer" or "Supervisor") Bernardino Íñiguez. This public office had functions that we would now call fiscal and administrative. It was his job to count the treasure gathered by the expeditions, in metals and precious stones, in order to assure the correct allotment of the quinto real — the "royal fifth": 20% of all treasure gained in the conquests was destined for the Spanish royal treasury, a fiscal norm that originated in the Reconquista, the re-conquest of Spain from the Muslims — and of other legal requisites, such as reading to the Indians, before attacking them, a declaration of intentions and a warning, to legalize the aggression in the face of possible future investigations. (Cortés was especially scrupulous with this formal requirement, useless when one lacked interpreters who could translate the message to the Indians). If the expedition went to Guanajes to kidnap Indians, the Veedor's presence would have been downright inconvenient for them. Although, on the other hand, according to Bernal, Íñiguez was nothing but a soldier who carried out the role of veedor, his being so designated in advance indicates that there was at least some thought of the possibility of exploration.

In short, from the data in hand one could make the case that Hernández de Córdoba discovered Yucatán by accident, upon finding his expedition — initially headed on a shorter voyage to kidnap Indians for the haciendas of Cuba — driven from its course by a storm. Or one could suppose that after some evil thoughts by Diego Velázquez, promptly rebuked and found blameworthy by the other Spaniards, who furthermore were willing to continue without Indians in Cuba, the voyage was planned exclusively as one of discovery and conquest, and for that purpose they brought the Veedor, and such a good pilot. One could also believe, with Las Casas, that the project proceeded with both objectives in mind.

== Spanish exploration of Yucatán: the Gran Cairo ==
Whether or not they were in search of Indians of the Guanajes islets, on February 8, 1517 they left Havana in two warships and a brigantine, crewed by over 100 men. The captain of the expedition was Francisco Hernández de Córdoba, the pilot Antón de Alaminos, from Palos. Camacho de Triana (the name suggests he was from Seville) and Joan Álvarez de Huelva (nicknamed "el manquillo", which indicates that he was missing a limb), piloted the other two ships.

Until February 20 they followed the coast of "Isla Fernandina" (Cuba). At the point of Cape San Antonio, Cuba, they took to the open sea.

There followed two days and nights of furious storm, according to Bernal so strong as to endanger the ships, and in any case sufficient to consolidate the doubt about the objective of the expedition, because after the storm one may suspect that they did not know their location.

Later they had 21 days of fair weather and calm seas after which they spotted land and, quite near the coast and visible from the ships, the first large populated center seen by Europeans in the Americas, with the first solidly built buildings. The Spaniards, who evoked the Muslims in all that was developed but not Christian, spoke of this first city they discovered in America as El gran Cairo, as they later were to refer to pyramids or other religious buildings as mezquitas, "mosques". "This land was as yet undiscovered...from the ships we could see a large town, which appeared to lie six miles back from the coast, and as we had never seen one as large in Cuba or Hispaniola we named it the Great Cairo."

It is reasonable to designate this moment as the first European knowledge of Yucatán—even "of Mexico", if one uses "Mexico" in the sense of the borders of the modern nation state—but Hernández's expeditionaries were not the first Spaniards to tread on Yucatán. In 1511, a ship of the fleet of Diego de Nicuesa, which was returning to Hispaniola, wrecked near the coast of Yucatán, and some of its occupants managed to save themselves. At the moment in which the soldiers of Hernández saw and named El gran Cairo, two of those shipwrecked sailors, Jerónimo de Aguilar and Gonzalo Guerrero, were living in the area of Campeche, speaking the Mayan language of the area, and Gonzalo Guerrero even seems to have been governing an indigenous community. This does not remove the merit of Hernández as a discoverer: one may insist that merit of discovery ought to involve a voluntary act, not a shipwreck; Nicuesa's shipwrecked sailors who were not sacrificed or worked to death by their Maya captors ended up enslaved.

The two ships of shallower draft went on ahead to investigate whether they could anchor securely near land. Bernal dates March 4, 1517 as the first encounter with the Indians of Yucatán, who approached those ships in ten large canoes (called pirogues), using both sails and oars. Making themselves understood by signs — the first interpreters, Julián and Melchior, were obtained by precisely this expedition — the Indians, always with "smiling face and every appearance of friendliness", communicated to the Spaniards that the next day more pirogues would come to bring the recent arrivals to land.

== Supposed etymology of Yucatán, and the more probable etymology of Catoche ==
This moment in which the Indians came up to the Spanish ships and accepted strings of green beads and other trifles fashioned for this purpose was one of the few peaceful contacts that Hernández's group had with the Indians, and even these gestures of peace were feigned on the part of the Indians. These encounters of March 4 may have given rise to toponyms Yucatán and Catoche, so striking that its accuracy has been questioned- is often cited. Be it history or legend, the story is that the Spaniards asked the Indians for the name of the land they had just discovered and on hearing the predictable replies to the effect of "I don't understand what you said", "those are our houses" gave the land names based on what they had heard: Yucatán, meaning "I don't understand you" for the whole "province" (or island, as they thought), and Catoche, meaning "our houses", for the settlement and the cape where they had debarked.

Fray Diego de Landa dedicated the second chapter of his Relación de las cosas de Yucatán to "Etymology of the name of this province. Its situation," and in it he confirms that Catoche derives from cotoch, "our houses, our homeland", but does not confirm that Yucatán means "I don't understand".

Finally, Bernal Díaz del Castillo also takes up the matter. He confirms the etymology of Catoche as "our houses", but for Yucatán he provides an even more surprising explanation than "I don't understand". According to his account, the Indians captured in the Battle of Catoche, Julian and Melchior, in their first conversations with the Spanish in Cuba, at which Diego Velázquez was present, had spoken of bread (Spanish: "pan"). The Spaniards explaining that their bread was made of "yuca" (cassava), the Maya Indians explaining that theirs was called "tlati", and from the repetition of "yuca" (a Carib word, not a Mayan word) and "tlati" during this conversation the Spaniards falsely deduced that they had intended to teach the name of their land: Yuca-tán.

It is probable that the first narrator of the "I don't understand" story was Fray Toribio de Benavente, a.k.a. Motolinia, who at the end of chapter 8 of the third book of his Historia de los indios de la Nueva España (History of the Indians of New Spain, written c. 1541) says: "because speaking with those Indians of that coast, to that which the Spaniards asked the Indians responded: Tectetán, Tectetán, which means: I don't understand you, I don't understand you: the Christians corrupted the word, and not understanding what the Indians meant, said: Yucatán is the name of this land; and the same happened with a cape made by the land there, which they named the Cape of Cotoch, and Cotoch in that language means house."

A similar version is given by Francisco López de Gómara, writing about eleven years later in his biography of Cortés. However, there is no clear cognate in 16th century Yucatec which closely matches this phonology (although t'an or t'aan is a common Mayan root for "language, speech"); it has also been suggested that the derivation comes from the Chontal word yokatan meaning "language" or the region where the language is spoken.

The anecdote is so attractive that this story of the etymology of Yucatán (together with an exactly parallel, but apocryphal, story that kangaroo comes from some Aboriginal Australian's expression for "I don't understand the question") is often repeated as trivia without much concern as to whether it is true.

== Battle of Catoche, exploration of the "island" of Yucatán, discovery of Lázaro (Campeche) ==
The following day, as promised, the natives returned with more canoes, to transfer the Spaniards to land. They were alarmed that the shore was full of natives, and that consequently the landing might prove to be dangerous. Nonetheless, they landed as they were asked to by their until-now friendly host, the cacique (chief) of El gran Cairo, deciding however to land en masse using also their own launches as a precaution. It also appears they armed themselves with crossbows and muskets (escopetas); "fifteen crossbows and ten muskets", if we credit the remarkably precise memory of Bernal Díaz del Castillo.

The Spaniards' fears were almost immediately confirmed. The chief had prepared an ambush for the Spaniards as they approached the town. They were attacked by a multitude of Indians, armed with pikes, bucklers, slings (Bernal says slings; Diego de Landa denies that the Indians of Yucatán were familiar with slings; he says they threw stones with their right hand, using the left to aim; but the sling was known in other parts of Mesoamerica, and the testimony of those at whom the stones were aimed seems worth crediting), arrows launched from a bow, and cotton armor. Only the surprise resulting from the effectiveness of the Spaniards' weapons — swords, crossbows, and firearms — put the more numerous Indians to flight, and allowed the Spaniards to re-embark, having suffered the first injuries of the expedition.

During this battle of Catoche two things occurred that were to greatly influence future events. The first was the capture of two Indians, taken back on board the Spanish ships. These individuals, who once baptized into the Roman Catholic faith received the names Julianillo and Melchorejo (anglicized, Julián and Melchior), would later become the first Maya language interpreters for the Spanish, on Grijalva's subsequent expedition. The second originated from the curiosity and valor of the cleric González, chaplain of the group, who having landed with the soldiers, undertook to explore — and plunder — a pyramid and some adoratorios while his companions were trying to save their lives. González had the first view of Maya idols and he brought away with him pieces "half of gold, and the rest copper", which in all ways would suffice to excite the covetousness of the Spaniards of Cuba upon the expedition's return.

At least two soldiers died as a result of their injuries in this battle.

Returning in the ships, Antón de Alaminos imposed slow and vigilant navigation, moving only by day, because he was certain that Yucatán was an island. The travellers' greatest hardship, a scarcity of potable water aboard, added to their woes. The stores of water, casks and jugs were not of the quality required for long voyages ("we were too poor to buy good ones", laments Bernal); the casks were constantly losing water and they also failed to keep it fresh, and so de Córdoba's ships needed to replenish their supplies ashore. The Spaniards had already noted that the region seemed to be devoid of freshwater rivers.

Fifteen days after the battle at Catoche, the expedition landed to fill their water vessels near a Maya village they called Lázaro (after St Lazarus' Sunday, the day of their landing; "The proper Indian name for it is Campeche", clarifies Bernal). Once again they were approached by Indians appearing to be peaceable, and the now-suspicious Spaniards maintained a heavy guard on their disembarked forces. During an uneasy meeting, the local Indians repeated a word (according to Bernal) that ought to have been enigmatic to the Spaniards: "Castilan". This curious incident of the Indians apparently knowing the Spaniards' own word for themselves they later attributed the presence of the shipwrecked voyagers of de Nicuesa's unfortunate 1511 fleet. Unbeknownst to de Córdoba's men, the two remaining survivors, Jerónimo de Aguilar and Gonzalo Guerrero, were living only several days' walk from the present site. The Spaniards would not learn of these two men until the expedition of Hernán Cortés, two years later.

The Spaniards found a solidly-built well the Indians used to provide themselves with fresh water from which the visitors filled their casks and jugs. The Indians, again with friendly aspect and manner, brought them to their village, where once more they could see solid constructions and many idols (Bernal alludes to the painted figures of serpents on the walls, so characteristic of Mesoamerica). They also met their first priests, with their white tunics and their long hair impregnated with human blood; this was the end of the Indians' friendly conduct: they convoked a great number of warriors and ordered them to burn some dry reeds, indicating to the Spaniards that if they weren't gone before the fire went out, they would be attacked. Hernández's men decided to retreat to the boats with their casks and jugs of water before the Indians could attack them, leaving safely behind them the discovery of Campeche.

== Champotón–Potonchán, and the "Coast of the Evil Battle" ==
They sailed some six days in good weather and another four in a tempest that almost wrecked their ships. Their supply of good drinking water was now yet again exhausted, owing to the poor condition of the containers. Being now in an extreme situation, they stopped to gather water in a place that Bernal sometimes calls Potonchán and sometimes by its present-day name of Champotón, where the river of the same name meets the sea. When they had filled the jugs, they found themselves surrounded by great assemblies of Indians. They passed the night on land, with great precautions and wakeful vigilance.

This time the Spaniards decided not to take flight as in Lázaro-Campeche: they needed water, and any retreat, hindered by the Indians, seemed more dangerous than attack. They decided to stay and fight, but the outcome was bad for them: when dawn broke, they were evidently vastly outnumbered (by three hundred to one, claims Bernal), and only shortly into the ensuing battle Bernal speaks of eighty injured Spaniards. Keeping in mind that the original number of the expedition was about a hundred, not all soldiers, this suggests that at that moment the expedition was close to destruction. They soon discovered that the legions of Indians were being continually replenished by fresh reinforcements, and if good swords, crossbows, and muskets had astonished them at first, they had now overcome the surprise and maintained a certain distance from the Spaniards. At the cry of "Calachuni", which the conquistadors soon learned was a word for "chief" or "captain", the Indians were particularly merciless in attacking Hernández de Córdoba, who was hit by twelve arrows. The Spanish also learned the dedication of their opponents to capturing people alive: two were taken prisoner and certainly sacrificed afterwards; of one we know that his name was Alonso Boto, and of the other Bernal is only able to say of him that he was "an old Portuguese".

Eventually, with only one Spanish soldier remaining unhurt, the captain practically unconscious, and the aggression of the Indians only increasing, they decided then that their only recourse was to form a close phalanx and break out of their encirclement in the direction of the launches, and to return to board them — leaving behind the water jugs — and get back to the ships. Fortunately for them, the Indians hadn't concerned themselves to take away the boats or to render them useless, as they might easily have done. When attacking the retreating boats with arrows, stones, and pikes they made a particular effort to interfere with their balance by weight and impact, and ended up dumping some of the Spaniards into the water. The survivors of Hernández's men had to get quickly out to their ships, half swimming and hanging onto the edges of the launches, but in the end they were recovered by the boat with the shallowest draught, and reached safety.

The Spaniards had lost 57 companions, including two who were taken alive. The survivors were badly injured, with the sole exception of a soldier named Berrio, who was surprisingly unscathed. Five died in the following days, the bodies being buried at sea.

The Spanish called the place the "La Costa de Mala Pelea" "coast of the evil battle", a name it would have on maps for many years.

== Thirst, and return by way of Florida ==
The expeditionaries had returned to the ships without the fresh water that had been the original reason to land. Furthermore, they saw their crew reduced by more than fifty men, many of them sailors, which combined with the great number of the seriously injured made it an impossibility to operate three ships. They broke up the ship of least draught burning it on the high sea, after having distributed to the others two its sails, anchors, and cables.

The thirst began to become intolerable. Bernal writes that their "mouths and tongues were cracked", and of soldiers who were driven by desperation to drink brackish water at a place which they called El Estero de los Lagartos, because of the large alligators.

The pilots Alaminos, Camacho, and Álvarez decided, on the initiative of Alaminos, to navigate to Florida rather than head directly for Cuba. Alaminos remembered his exploration of Florida with Juan Ponce de León, and believed this to be the safest route, although promptly upon arriving in Florida he advised his companions of the bellicosity of the local Indians. In the event, the twenty people — among them, Bernal and the pilot Alaminos — who debarked in search of water were attacked by natives, although this time they came out victorious, with Bernal nonetheless receiving his third injury of the voyage, and Alaminos taking an arrow in the neck. A sentry - Berrio, the only soldier to escape from Champotón unscathed - disappeared. But the rest were able to return to the boat, and finally brought fresh water to alleviate the suffering of those who had remained with the boat, although one of them (according to Bernal) drank so much that he swelled up and died within a few days.

Now with fresh water, they headed to Havana in the two remaining ships, and not without difficulties — the boats were deteriorated and taking on water, and some mutinous sailors refused to work the pumps — they were able to complete their voyage and disembark in the port of Carenas (Havana).

Francisco Hernández de Córdoba barely reached Cuba; suffering from his mortal wounds, he expired within days of reaching the port, along with three other sailors.

== Consequences of the Spanish arrival at Yucatán ==
The discovery of El Gran Cairo, in March 1517, was without a doubt a crucial moment in the Spanish perception of the natives of the Americas: until then, nothing had resembled the stories of Marco Polo, or the promises of Columbus, which prophesied Cathay, or even the Garden of Paradise, just past every cape or river. Even more than the later encounters with the Aztec and Inca cultures, El Gran Cairo resembled the conquistadors' dreams. When the news arrived in Cuba, the Spaniards gave new energy to their imaginations, creating again fantasies about the origin of the people they had encountered, whom they referred to as "the Gentiles" or imagined to be "the Jews exiled from Jerusalem by Titus and Vespasian".

All of this encouraged two further expeditions: the first in 1518 under the command of Juan de Grijalva, and the second in 1519 under the command of Hernán Cortés, which led to the Spanish exploration, military invasion, and ultimately settlement and colonization known as the Spanish conquest of the Aztec Empire and subsequent Spanish colonization in present-day Mexico. Hernández did not live to see the continuation of his work; he died in 1517, the year of his expedition, as the result of the injuries and the extreme thirst suffered during the voyage and disappointed in the knowledge that Diego Velázquez had given precedence to Grijalva as the captain of the next expedition to Yucatán.

The importance given to the news, objects, and people that Hernández brought to Cuba can be gleaned from the speed with which the following expedition was prepared. The governor Diego Velázquez placed his relative Juan de Grijalva in charge of this second expedition, who had his entire confidence. The news that this "island" of Yucatán had gold, doubted by Bernal but enthusiastically maintained by Julianillo, the Maya prisoner taken at the battle of Catoche, fed the subsequent series of events that was to end with the Conquest of Mexico by the third flotilla sent, that of Hernán Cortés.

== See also ==
- Spanish conquest of Yucatán
- Spanish colonization of the Americas
- The Conquest of New Spain
