= Diego Velázquez de Cuéllar =

Spanish conquistador; 1st colonial governor of Cuba (1511–24)

Adelantado Diego Velázquez de Cuéllar
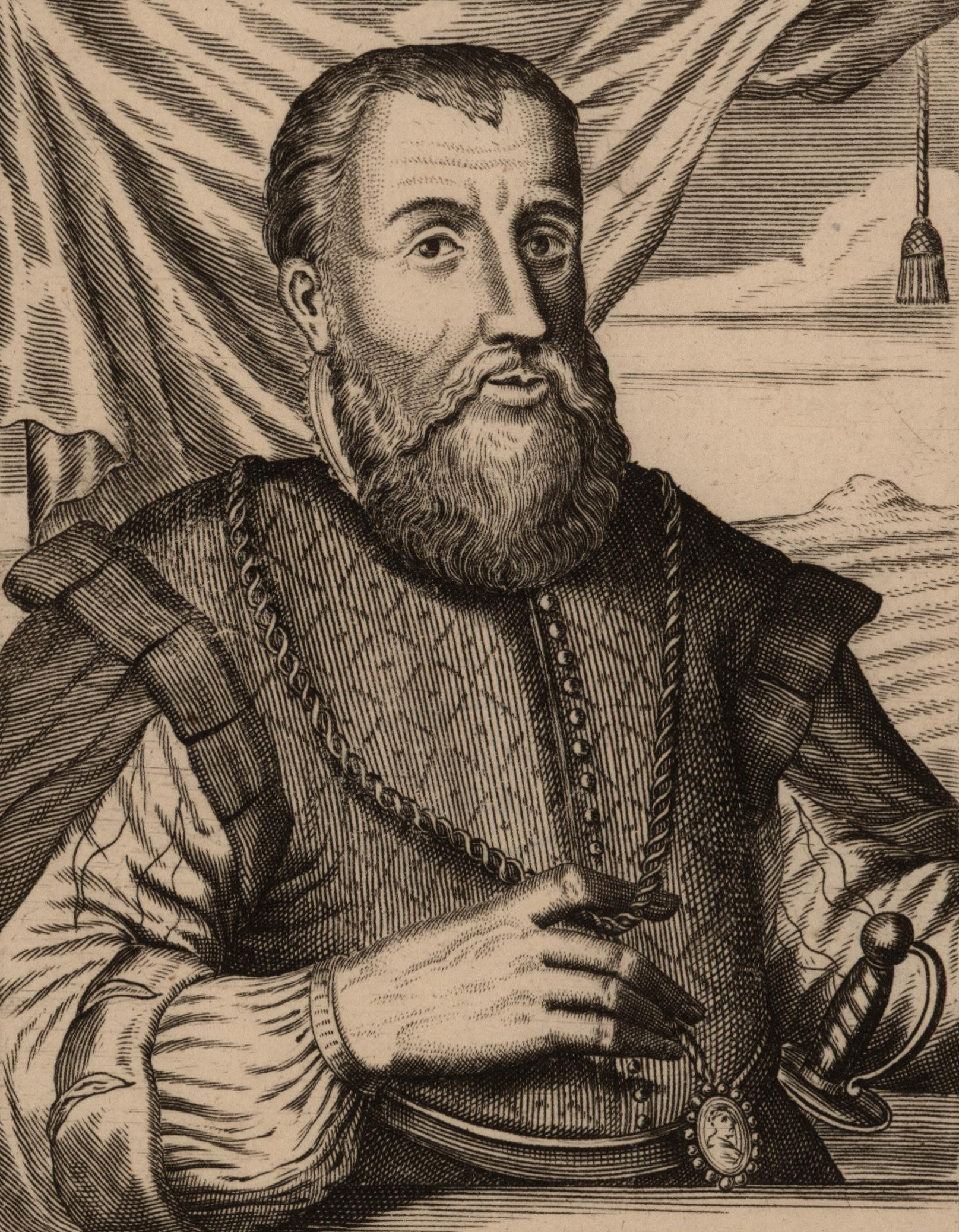
- 1728 portrait of Diego Velázquez de Cuéllar

1st Governor of Cuba
- In office November 1511 – June 1524
- Monarchs: Joanna I and Charles I
- Succeeded by: Juan Altamirano

Personal details
- Born: 1465 Cuéllar, Segovia, Crown of Castile
- Died: c. June 12, 1524 (aged 58–59) Santiago de Cuba, Cuba, New Spain

Diego Velázquez de Cuéllar (Note: Pronounced: Spanish: [ˈdjeɣo βeˈlaθkeθ ðe ˈkweʎaɾ]) (1465 – c. June 12, 1524) was a Spanish conquistador and adelantado who was first governor of Cuba. In 1511 he led the successful conquest and colonization of Cuba. As the first governor of the island, he established several municipalities that remain important to this day and positioned Cuba as a center of trade and a staging point for expeditions of conquest elsewhere. From Cuba, he chartered important expeditions that led to the Spanish discovery and conquest of the Aztec Empire.

== Early life ==
Little is known about the early life of Velázquez. He was born in Cuéllar around 1465, in the Segovia region of Spain. For a time he was a member of the Spanish military and served in Naples. Afterward, he returned to Spain and lived in Seville. In September 1493, Velázquez was one of 1,500 men who sailed with Columbus on his second voyage to the New World. Velázquez never returned to Spain.

Velázquez settled on the island of Hispaniola and survived the early hardships which killed many colonists or drove them back home. In time, he demonstrated an aptitude for dealing with the political factions on the island. He was well regarded by Bartholomew Columbus, the younger brother of Christopher and the administrator of the island from 1493 to 1500. In times when Bartholomew left the island, he made Velázquez acting governor of Hispaniola.

There is no record of Velázquez during Francisco de Bobadilla's brief tenure as governor of the island, but when Nicolás de Ovando was appointed to the post in 1501, Velázquez quickly became one of the governor's trusted lieutenants. In July 1503, when a Taíno revolt broke out in the western provinces of the island, Velázquez was ordered to Jaragua where he quashed the rebellion.

After the revolt, Ovando determined that five new towns should be built in the rebellious territory. Velázquez was sent to the western end of the island to establish Salvatierra de la Zabana and perhaps other towns. He resided in Salvatierra de la Zabana and all of the new settlements were placed under his administration. By 1511, Velázquez was one of the wealthiest men on Hispaniola. He held encomiendas at Verapaz, Salvatierra de la Zabana, and Santiago de Caballeros, where he was a partner with an unidentified encomendero in mining enterprises.

== Conquest of Cuba ==
When Diego Columbus became governor in 1509, he was instructed by King Ferdinand to explore, conquer, and colonize the neighboring island of Cuba in hopes of obtaining new sources of gold and Native labor. Miguel de Pasamonte, the king's treasurer in the Caribbean, was influential in seeing that Columbus selected Velázquez to lead the expedition. Velázquez was to finance the project himself and though Columbus assured him that the Crown would reimburse him later, no money was ever forthcoming. He assembled a small fleet of four ships and three hundred men among whom were several relatives, debt-ridden encomenderos, and a few who would later become notable, including Hernán Cortés and Pedro de Alvarado.

Velázquez sailed for Cuba in January 1511 and landed at a small harbor in the native province of Mayci. The Spaniards were opposed by a Taíno force led by Hatuey, formerly a chief from Hispaniola who fled to Cuba and helped the local Natives organize resistance to the incursion. The Taínos were outmatched by the Spanish weaponry and after two months of intermittent fighting, they were defeated. According to Bartolomé de las Casas, who did not arrive on the island until later, Hatuey was captured and burned alive at the stake.

The first Spanish settlement, Baracoa, was established on the northeast corner of the island by August 1511. It consisted of a fort surrounded by thatched huts and served as the initial base of operations for the Spanish occupation of Cuba. Later that year, Velázquez was joined by Pánfilo de Narváez who brought thirty Spanish archers and Native auxiliaries from Jamaica. Velázquez was glad for the reinforcements and made Narváez second in command. More than a year was spent consolidating control of the present-day Oriente province.

=== Personal life ===
In early 1513 Velázquez married Maria de Cuéllar in the new town of Baracoa. She was the daughter of the royal treasurer, Cristóbal de Cuéllar, and a former lady-in-waiting for Maria de Toledo, the wife of Diego Columbus. Maria died less than a week after their wedding.

=== Continued western expeditions ===
After a slow start, the conquest of Cuba accelerated dramatically in 1513 when Velázquez organized three expeditions to proceed west, explore the island, and establish a Spanish presence. Narvaez led a force through the interior of the country while Velázquez and a lieutenant proceeded along the south and north coasts respectively. Near the south coast, Narvaez soon met with a force of 2,500 Taínos led by their chief, Caguax. The Spanish struck first before they could be attacked by the Natives defending their land, defeating Caguex, and killing some one hundred Taínos. This was the last significant resistance faced by the Spanish and after that, they proceeded relatively unchallenged in their colonization and search for gold.

In October 1513, Velázquez received letters from the king that expanded his powers in Cuba. Velázquez was authorized to assign Indians to encomiendas and establish additional towns as warranted by his discoveries. In particular, he was encouraged to create settlements on the southern coast that would support trade with the growing Spanish presence in Panama. By 1514, the island was largely pacified and significant gold deposits were discovered at several sites on the island, setting off a brief gold rush that lasted until about 1520. At its peak, officials complained that the search for Cuban gold was depleting manpower in Hispaniola.

=== Founding towns ===
In addition to Baracoa, Velázquez used his authority to establish six more Cuban towns by 1515. Most of the new settlements were sited on the coast near gold deposits and significant populations of Indian laborers. Bayamo was founded in 1513, followed in 1514 by Trinidad, Sancti Spiritus, and Havana. Havana, destined to become the premier city of Cuba, was originally founded on the south coast. Camagüey was established in 1515. Velázquez added Santiago de Cuba in July 1515 and made it his residence and the new capital of the island.

Velázquez used the assignment of encomiendas to reward relatives and associates and thus ensure an island aristocracy that was loyal to him. By 1522 significant encomiendas were held by his relatives Juan de Grijalva and Manuel de Rojas; his close associates Panfilo de Narvaez, Bachiller de Alonso Parada, and Vasco Porcallo de Figueroa; and fourteen others. In total, these encomenderos controlled almost 3,000 Indian laborers.

The new colonizers did not wish to be under the personal authority of Diego Columbus, so Velázquez convoked a general cabildo (a local government council) which was duly authorized to deal directly with Spain, and therefore removed Velázquez and the colonizers from under the authority of Columbus, their nominal superior. It was a precedent that would come back to haunt him with the Mexican adventures.

== Conquest of Mexico ==
In 1514, Velázquez wrote to the king concerning rumors of unknown lands to the north and west of Cuba. Initially, these rumors were merely the subject of idle speculation and the king instructed Velázquez to remain focused on the governance of Cuba and especially the production of gold. However, as the demand for labor grew, slaving expeditions explored the region in search of natives to work the Cuban ranches and gold mines. Interest in exploration and conquest intensified in 1516 when a slave ship returned carrying 20,000 pesos of gold seized from the natives living on the Guanajes, a series of small islands off the coast of Central America.

Velázquez quickly commissioned Francisco Hernández de Córdoba to lead an expedition which sailed in February 1517, with instructions to explore certain neighboring islands. They soon came upon the shore of what they initially believed to be a large island, thus marking the Spanish discovery of the Yucatán Peninsula. Initial encounters with the Mayans living along the coast turned into armed conflict; 25 Spaniards were killed and many more wounded, including Córdoba himself. On his return to Cuba, Córdoba reported to Velázquez that the Mayans exhibited a sophistication not seen before in the region, including buildings of stone and mortar, clothing of woven cloth, and ornamentation of gold and silver.

Velázquez organized another expedition, hoping to trade with the Mayans for their gold, "for there must have been much there." He put his nephew, Juan de Grijalva, in command of four ships that departed Cuba in January 1518. Grijalva sailed along the Yucatan and then headed northwards following the Mexican coastline, exploring and trading with the natives as the opportunity arose. When Grijalva returned in October he brought back a profit of 20,000 crowns, but Velázquez was angry with his nephew and felt that the returns did not justify the time and effort.

Even before Grijalva returned, Velázquez was preparing for another, larger expedition to the Yucatan. He sent a representative to Spain requesting authority to trade with or conquer the new lands and was granted the title of adelantado of the Yucatan and any other lands he might discover. Velázquez was unsure of who should lead this latest effort and after some hesitancy selected Hernán Cortés. Relations between them had been turbulent. Cortés served as the governor's private secretary during the initial conquest but was later involved in a plot to overthrow him. The attempted coup nearly cost Cortés his life but Velázquez pardoned him and awarded Cortés with one of the first encomiendas in Cuba.

Cortés readily accepted the commission and quickly began to organize a fleet and recruit volunteers. The governor soon regretted his choice when friends and allies warned him that his former secretary could not be trusted to remain loyal. In response, Velázquez named Vasco Porcallo to replace Cortés but when messages were sent ordering him to relinquish command, Cortés refused and even managed to recruit one of the messengers to his cause. Despite further requests and demands, Cortés refused to turn over his command. In February 1519, he left Havana for Mexico with ten ships and about 500 fighting men, effectively declaring himself free of Velázquez's authority.

In August 1519, Velázquez received word that Cortés had sent a ship to Spain carrying Aztec treasure and a request to be recognized as the rightful leader of the new territory. Velázquez hurriedly sent an emissary to Spain, contesting Cortés and reasserting his authority. The Crown agreed to hear the dispute but postponed a decision for two years, perhaps waiting to see how the struggle was resolved in the field.

Velázquez was determined to remove Cortés by force if necessary. In early 1520, he organized an armada of about 1,000 fighting men and 18 ships equipped with both light and heavy artillery. Pánfilo de Narváez was selected to lead the force with instructions to arrest Cortés and assume the government of the new territory on behalf of Velázquez. Instead, Narváez was easily defeated and Cortés persuaded most of the force to switch sides and join his invasion of the Aztec empire. The failed adventure was a disaster for Velázquez; he lost a substantial fortune invested in the fleet and left Cuba seriously depopulated and vulnerable to a Native uprising.

== Later life ==
Velázquez spent the remaining few years of his life defending his governorship in Cuba and continuing his dispute with Cortes. Diego Colón perhaps sensed that Velázquez was politically vulnerable; he sent Alonso Zuazo to Cuba in January 1521, to replace the governor and conduct his residencia. (Note: A formal review of an official's time in office conducted at the end of his tenure) However, Colon himself was in political difficulties and under investigation by the Crown. Finally, by July 1523, Colon was recalled to Spain and Velázquez was fully restored to office.

In 1522, Carlos I formally recognized Cortes as governor of New Spain, thus ending Velázquez's claims to the newly conquered territory. In 1523, Cortés made Cristóbal de Olid the leader of an expedition to conquer Honduras. While resupplying in Havana, Olid conspired with Velázquez and they agreed that Olid would renounce Cortes and capture Honduras on behalf of Velázquez. When Cortes heard of this plot, he wrote a letter of protest to the king and then dispatched his agents to Honduras where they eventually killed Olid.

Velázquez's health began to fail in the summer of 1523; a year later, he died on June 11 or 12, 1524. At his request, he was buried under the altar steps of the new cathedral in Santiago. His close associate, Gonzalo de Guzman, was the principal heir of his estate and would later serve two terms as governor. Even before he died, plans were underway to replace Velázquez. In May 1524, Carlos II named Juan Altamirano to conduct a residencia and become the new governor of Cuba.

At the time of his death at the age of 59, Velázquez was "the richest Spaniard in the Americas," despite financial losses on the expedition of Francisco Hernández de Córdoba and of Hernán Cortés. He completed the successful conquest and colonization of Cuba, founded towns that remain important today, made Cuba economically prosperous, and positioned it as a center of trade and a staging point for expeditions of conquest elsewhere.

== See also ==
- List of viceroys of New Spain
- Viceroyalty of New Spain
- History of Cuba
- History of Havana

== Bibliography ==
- Florstedt, Robert (1942). Diego Velázquez, first governor of Cuba (MA). Ohio State University.
- Floyd, Troy (1973). The Columbus Dynasty in the Caribbean, 1492-1526. Albuquerque: University of New Mexico Press.
- Kent, Jacquelyn Briggs (1996). "Diego de Velásquez". Encyclopedia of Latin American History and Culture. Vol. 6 (2nd ed.). Charles Scribner's Sons. pp. 307–308.
- Martínez-Fernández, Luis (2018). Key to the New World: a History of Early Colonial Cuba. Gainesville: University of Florida Press. pp. 68–79. ISBN 9781683400325.
- Restall, Matthew (2018). When Montezuma Met Cortés: The True Story of the Meeting that Changed History (First ed.). New York, NY: HarperCollins. ISBN 9780062427267.
- Sauer, Carl Ortwin (1966). The Early Spanish Main. University of California Press.
- Thomas, Hugh (2003). Rivers of Gold: the Rise of the Spanish Empire, from Columbus to Magellan (1st U.S. ed.). New York: Random House. ISBN 0375502041.
- Wright, Irene Aloha (1916). The Early History of Cuba, 1492-1586. MacMillan Company.
