= Indigenous peoples of Cuba =

Indigenous peoples in Cuba
Personas indígenas de Cuba (Spanish)
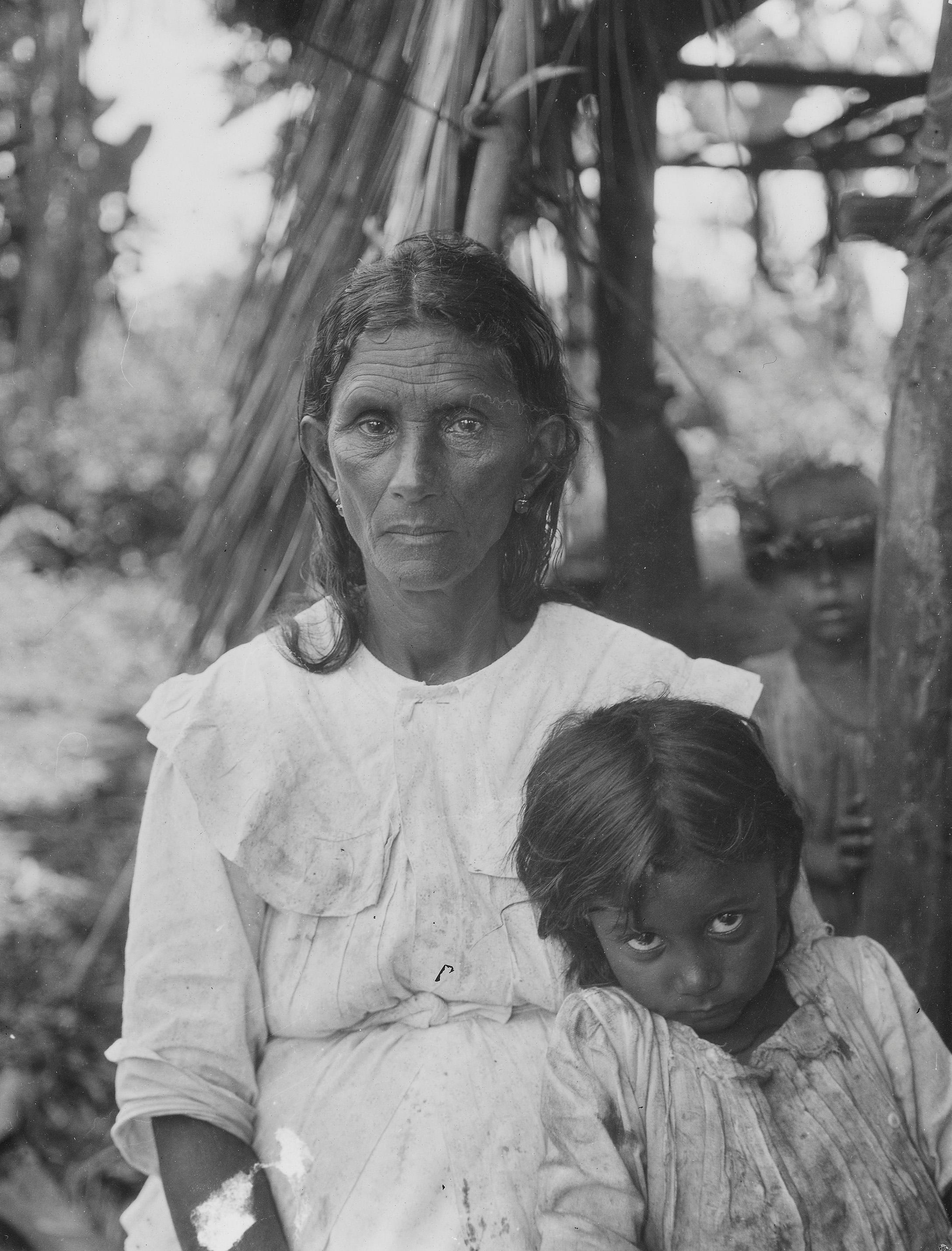
- Indigenous woman and child in Baracoa, Guantánamo Province

Total population
- 4,000 people with more than half Indigenous ancestry (est.)

Regions with significant populations
- Cuba

Languages
- Spanish

Religion
- Catholic

Indigenous peoples in Cuba are the descendants of the original peoples who inhabited Cuba before the arrival of the Europeans in 1492. Multiple Indigenous peoples inhabited the island, including the Ciboney, the Guanahatabeyes and Guaniguaníes of western Cuba, and the Tainos who migrated to eastern Cuba from Hispaniola. Due to the Taíno genocide and intermarriage, there are very few Indigenous peoples remaining today.

== Terminology ==
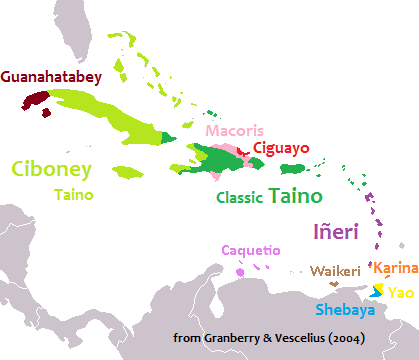
Location of the Guanhatabey, Ciboney (Taíno group), and Classic Taíno pre-Columbian people

Some scholars such as Julian Granberry and Gary S. Vescelius classify the Ciboney as a "Western Taíno" group, associating them with the peoples of the Bahamas (Lucayans), westernmost Hispaniola, and possibly Jamaica, while distinguishing them from the "Classic Taíno", a grouping within which they include Taino in eastern Cuba who migrated from Hispaniola, the Taino of eastern Hispaniola, and the Puerto Rican Taino. The archaeologist L. Antonio Curet has questioned whether the Ciboney people should be referred to as Taínos, writing that "Despite its widespread use in academic and popular publications, the use of the term Taíno has not gone without criticism or opposition" and that academics since the 1800s have been "criticizing its use and questioning its scientific basis and value and suggested using instead names such as siboneyes, haytianos, jamaiquinos, and borinqueños that were more related to actual terms used by the natives to refer to the islands."

The Puerto Rican historian Cayetano Coll y Toste did not use the term "Taino" to refer to the Ciboney or any other Indigenous peoples in the Greater Antilles. In his Prehistory of Puerto Rico, Coll y Toste wrote that some scholars used the term, but that he found "no scientific basis for this" stating his view that "Indo-Antilleans were Arawaks, and having lost the memory of their origin, they should be called...siboneyes, haytianos, jamaiquinos and boriqueños, because over time they had acquired their own personality."

== History ==
The Guanahatabey first arrived in western Cuba using small dugout canoes sometime in the 4th millennium BC.

When Christopher Columbus first made landfall in Holguín in 1492, there were three main groups on the island: the Taínos who migrated to eastern Cuba from Hispaniola, the Ciboneys of eastern and central Cuba, and the Guanahatabeys of western Cuba. Estimates for the pre-Columbian population vary, it may have been anywhere from 50,000 to 300,000 people. The Taínos were the largest group on the island.

=== Spanish arrival ===
The arrival of the Spanish and the subsequent Taíno genocide during the early and mid-16th century decimated the native Taíno population, as well as other groups. The Taíno language eventually went extinct in the 17th century as a result.

== Modern population ==
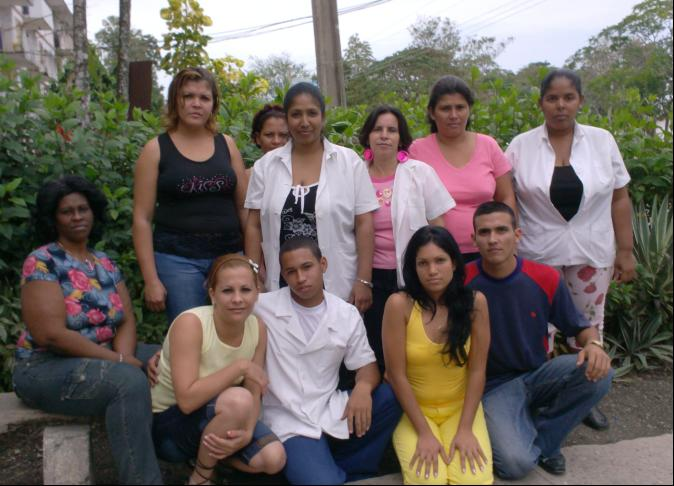
Mixed-race people in Río Cauto. Cubans still retain a small amount of Indigenous ancestry in the present day.

Currently, there are very few people of full Indigenous descent left in the country. In 2012, 64% of Cuba's population was white, 26.6% was mulatto, and 9.3% Black.

Although this is the case, a genetic study in 2014 found that out of a sample of 1,019 individuals from throughout the country, Amerindian admixture accounted for 8% of the total. In the eastern provinces of Granma, Holguín, and Las Tunas, the Amerindian admixture was estimated at 15%, 12% and 12% respectively. These findings imply that there may be a large group of mestizos in Cuba who still retain a small amount of Indigenous admixture, but it is unclear how much of this admixture is Taíno versus other Amerindian ethnic groups. It is also worth noting that African admixture is significantly larger because of the history of slavery in Cuba.

Historian Alejandro Hartmann Matos estimates there are around 4,000 people who have at least a majority of Taíno ancestry in Cuba.

The journalist Drew Hayden Taylor has stated that "there are no longer any Aboriginal people living in Cuba...That's true of most of the Caribbean islands, with the possible exception of Dominica, where the last surviving island Caribs are reputed to live." Taylor has stated his view that Indigenous-style cultural performances in Cuba are performed for tourists and are not culturally authentic.

== Communities ==
The communities in Cuba that partially retain an Indigenous or Taíno identity today are located in rural towns and hamlets on the eastern part of the island. (Note: Known as Oriente until 1976.)

Some municipalities with a reported Indigenous population:

- Baracoa
- Manuel Tames
- Yateras
- Maisí
- Jiguaní
- El Caney

== See also ==
- Indigenous peoples of the Caribbean
- Indigenous peoples of the Americas
