= Juan de Grijalva =

Spanish conquistador (1490–1527)

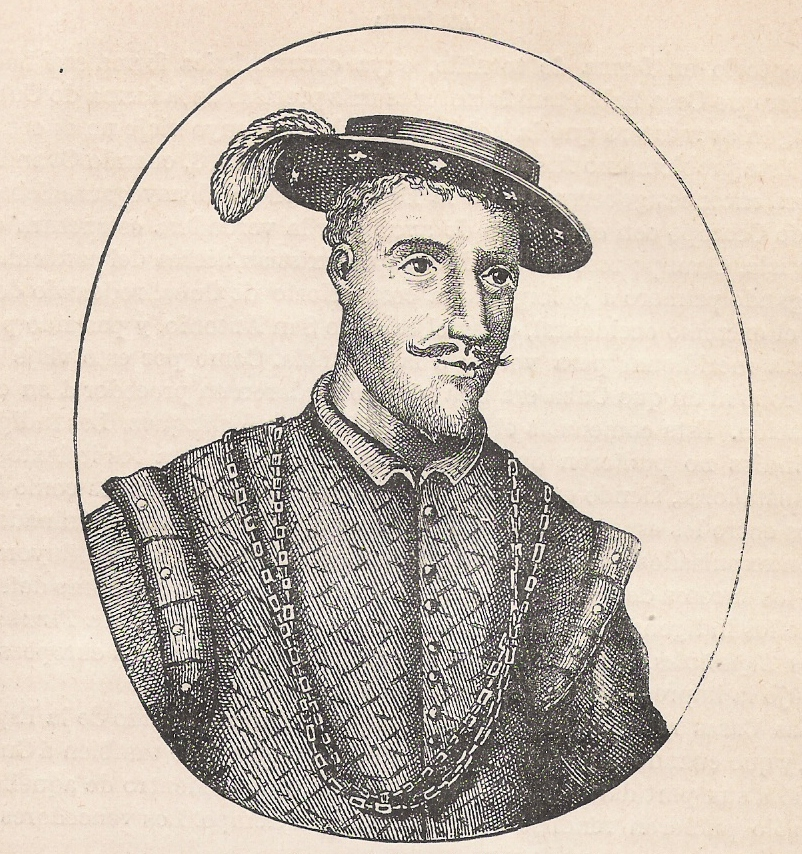
- Juan de Grijalva according to the General History of the Acts of the Castellans, by Antonio de Herrera y Tordesillas
- Born: 1489; Cuéllar, Castilla
- Died: 21 January 1527 (aged 37–38); Olancho, Honduras
- Occupation: Conquistador
- Known for: Spanish conquest of Cuba, Yucatán and Honduras

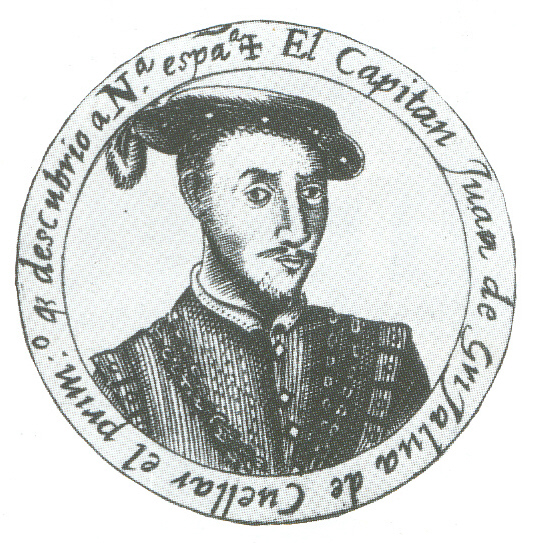
Juan de Grijalva

Juan de Grijalva (Spanish: [xwan de ɣɾiˈxalβa]; c. 1490 – 21 January 1527) was a Spanish conquistador, and a relative of Diego Velázquez. He went to Hispaniola in 1508 and to Cuba in 1511. He was one of the early explorers of the Mexican coastline, and was killed by natives in Honduras on 21 January 1527.

== 1518 expedition ==
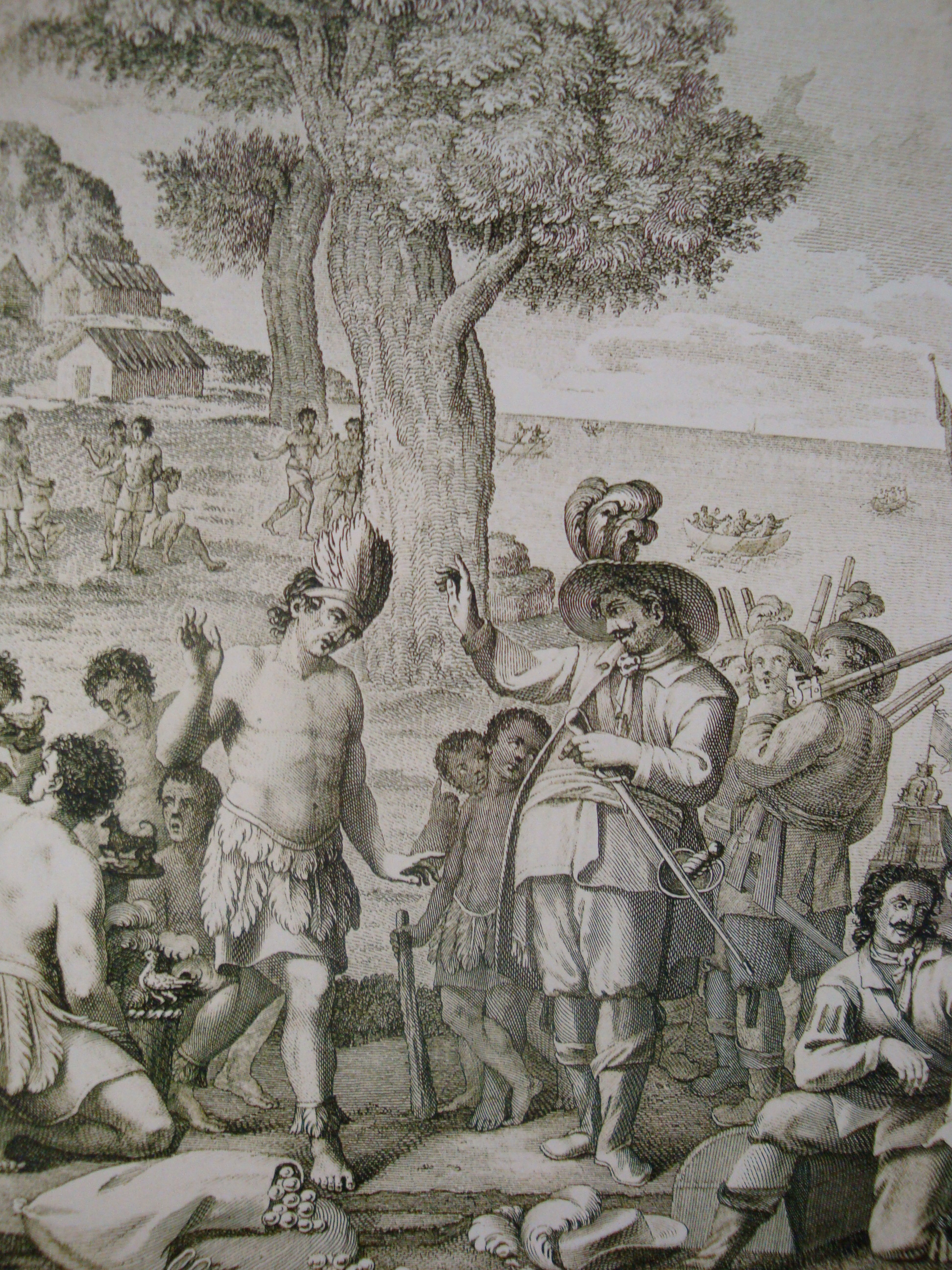
Meeting between Juan de Grijalva and the Mayan chieftain Tabscoob, occurred in Potonchán in 1518.

In 1518, Grijalva became one of the first to explore the shores of Mexico. According to Hernán Cortés, 170 people went with him, but according to Pedro Mártir, there were 300 people.
The main pilot was Antón de Alaminos, the other pilots were Juan Álvarez (also known as el Manquillo), Pedro Camacho de Triana, and Grijalva. Other members included Francisco de Montejo, Pedro de Alvarado, Bernal Díaz del Castillo, Juan Díaz, Francisco Peñalosa, Alonso de Ávila, Alonso Hernández, Antonio Villafaña and two natives from Yucatan, Julianillo (Julian) and Melchorejo (Melchor), who were captured during the Hernández de Córdoba expedition and now served as interpreters.
They embarked from the port of Matanzas, Cuba, with four ships on 8 April 1518.

Juan de Grijalva, expedition in 1518. Discovery by the Europeans of the Grijalva River.

After rounding the Guaniguanico in Cuba, Grijalva sailed along the Mexican coast, discovered Cozumel on 3 May 1518, and arrived on 8 June 1518 at the Tabasco region in southern Mexico. The Río Grijalva in Mexico was named after him. He was also the first Spaniard to encounter Moctezuma II's delegation. One of the natives joined them, being baptized as Francisco, and became a Nahuatl interpreter on Cortés' expedition. Bernal Díaz del Castillo wrote about the travels of Juan de Grijalva in his book Historia de las Indias..

According to W. H. Prescott's "Conquest of Mexico," Grijalva was the first Spaniard to bring back word of the plentiful gold hoard of the Aztecs, spurring the drive for conquest. In 1518 Hernán Cortés stayed at Juan's home in Trinidad, Cuba, at the start of his Mexican expedition. He recruited men there, including the five Alvarado brothers.

Juan de Grijalva was killed by natives in Honduras on 21 January 1527.
