= Antón de Alaminos =

Spanish navigator and explorer, b. 1482

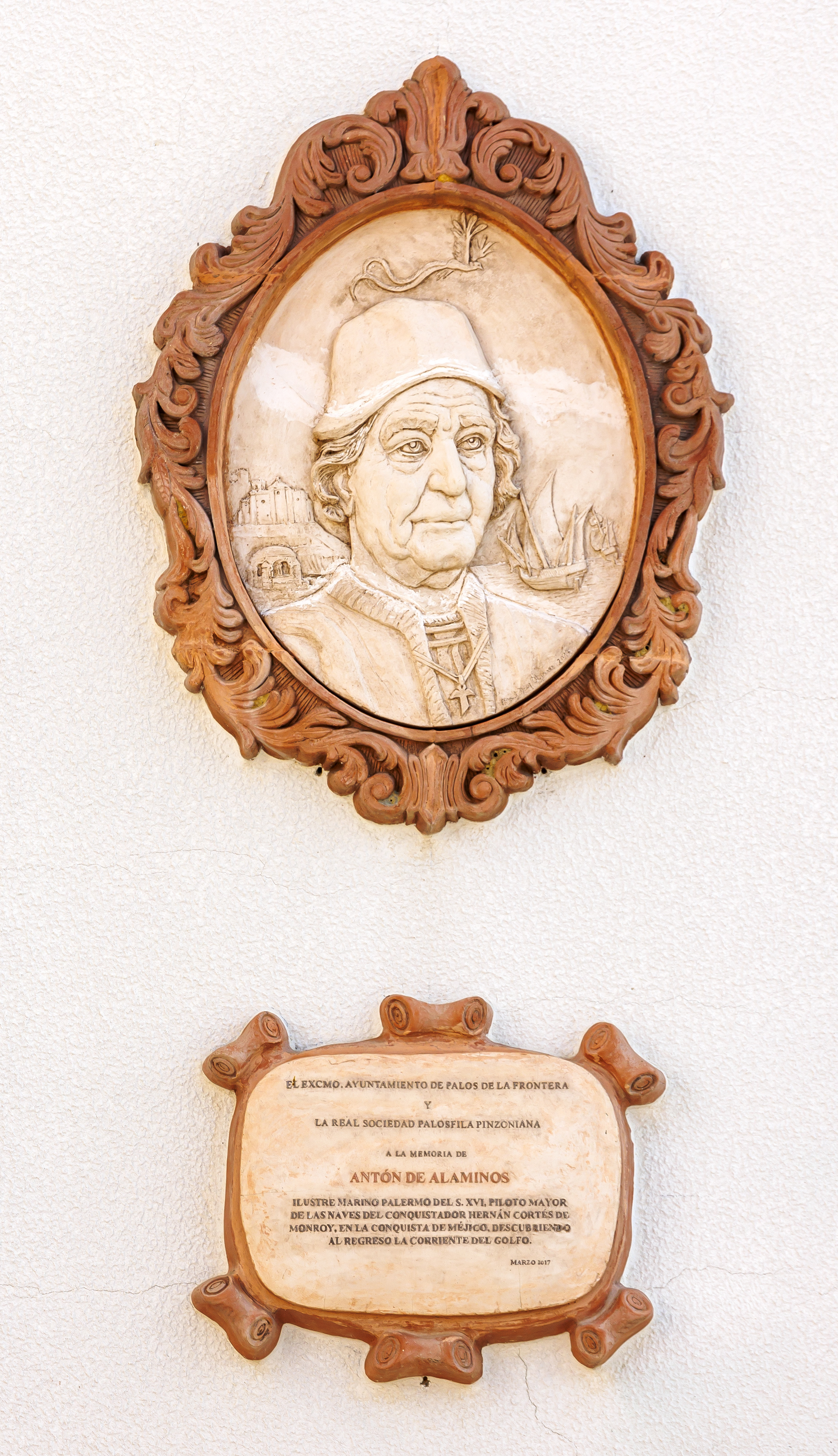
- Born: Palos de la Frontera
- Occupation: Navigator

Antón de Alaminos (c. 1482 - ?) was a Spanish navigator and explorer in the New World. He was considered the most experienced and knowledgeable marine pilot serving in the Spanish Main during the first quarter of the sixteenth century.

Antón de Alaminos was born in Palos de la Frontera around 1482 and joined Christopher Columbus on his fourth voyage to the Americas in 1502.

Together with Juan Ponce de León, Antón de Alaminos traveled to Florida in 1513. On this journey, on April 22nd, Alaminos discovered a strong ocean current, which was later named the Gulf Stream.

He was the first naval officer of the Spanish fleet that discovered the peninsula of Yucatan in the 1517 Cordoba expedition. He served under the commands of Grijalba and Hernan Cortes, and was the first to pass the Bahama channel.
