= Battle of Cempoala =

1520 battle during the Spanish conquest of the Aztec Empire

- Part of the Spanish conquest of the Aztec Empire
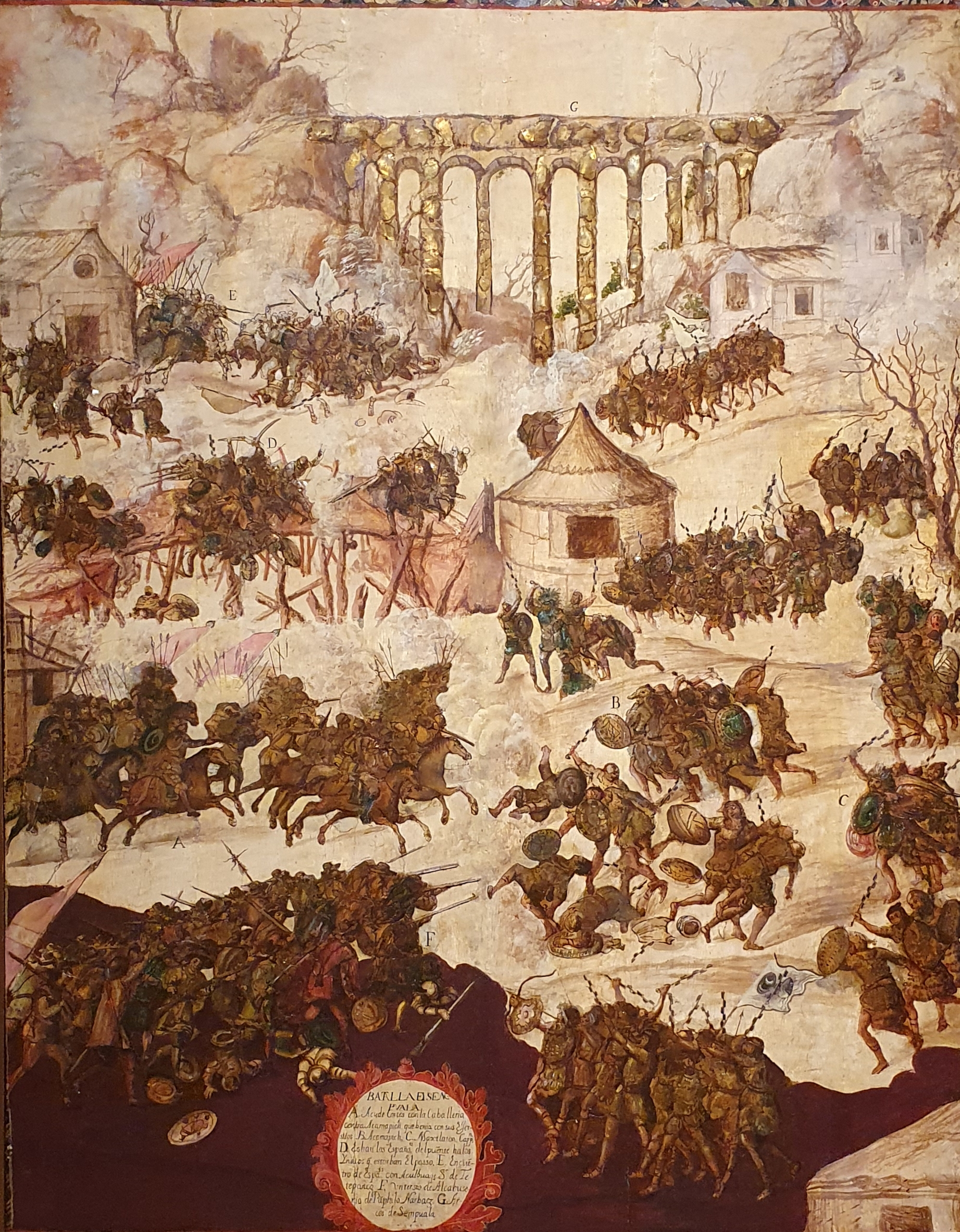
- 'Batalla de Zampoala' c. 1670–1740
Date	27 May 1520
Location	Cempoala, Mexico 19°26′50.3″N 96°24′13.2″W
Result	Cempoala victory

Belligerents
Cempoala of Totonacapan; Chinantla; Crown of Castile Spanish Empire	Governorate of Cuba

Commanders and leaders
Hernán Cortés; Gonzalo de Sandoval	Pánfilo de Narváez (WIA) (POW)

Strength
266 Spanish; 200 Chinantec warriors	900 Spanish: ~80 horsemen; ~80 musketeers; ~10 artillery

Casualties and losses
2 Spanish killed Unknown number of Spanish wounded Indigenous losses unknown	15 killed Unknown number of wounded

The Battle of Cempoala was fought on 27 May 1520 at Cempoala, Mexico, between the forces of Pánfilo de Narváez and the forces of Hernán Cortés, which were supported by Chinantec warriors.

== Background ==
While Cortés was enriching himself by leading an expedition in eastern Mexico, he tried to convince the King of Spain, in a series of letters, to take away Cuban governor Diego Velázquez de Cuéllar’s control over the campaign. When Velázquez heard about this, he was furious. He decided to send Pánfilo de Narváez to regain control of the expedition. On 5 March, Narváez departed for Mexico, taking Licenciado López Ayllón of the Audiencia of Santo Domingo as the king's representative.

=== Voyage ===
The voyage was chaotic from the start. Heavy storms sank 6 of the 19 ships, killing about 50 men. Several of the ships split up, Ayllón arrived first and Narváez didn’t land until 22 April, at which point Cortés had already found extravagant lodging in Tenochtitlan.

== Planning ==
Immediately after landing, Narváez attacked a small coastal garrison led by Gonzalo de Sandoval. Narváez's attack failed, causing him to lose several prisoners, who were sent to Cortes to warn him of the danger. In mid-May, Cortés left Tenochtitlan to deal with Narváez. Narváez took advantage of his numerical superiority and captured the city of Cempoala, making it his base of operations. He took as hostages the eight Cempolan noblewomen that had married Spanish men in Cortés' company, and allowed his men to mistreat the local population. Xicomecoatl, the ruler of the city and an ally to Cortés, threatened Narváez with calling Cortés, but he was forced into obedience.

For his part, after trading messengers with Narváez and ultimately resolving to free Cempoala by force, Cortés sent a soldier to contact their Chinantec allies for help. He returned with 200 warriors armed with long pikes, needed to counter Narváez's cavalry, and the promise that 2,000 more warriors would follow later.

== Battle ==
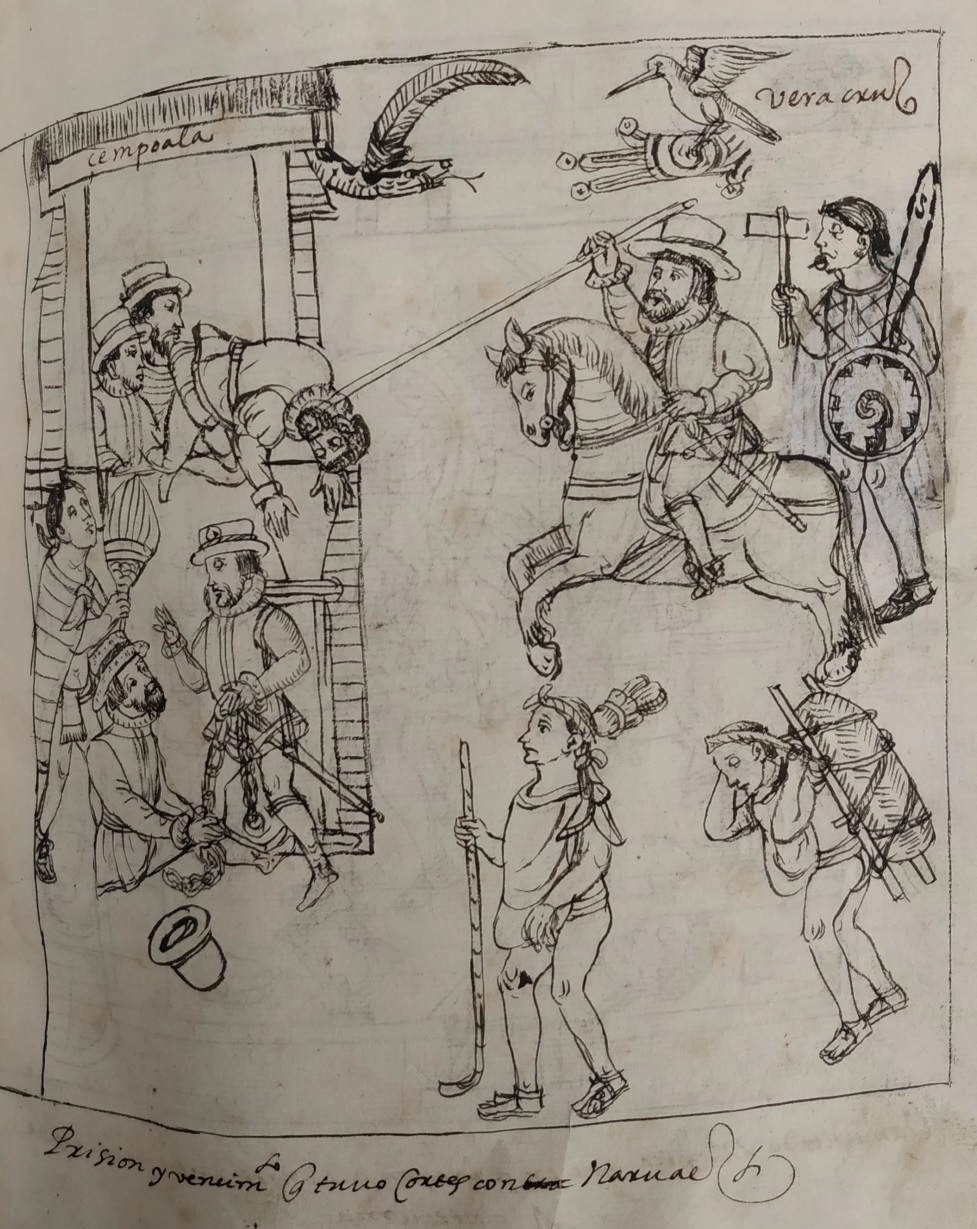
The defeat of Pánfilo de Narváez, according to Diego Muñoz Camargo

On 27 May, Cortés, Sandoval, and fellow conquistador captains launched a surprise attack on Narváez's forces in the middle of the night with 266 soldiers and 200 native auxiliary troops. Due to heavy rainfall and superior numbers, Cortés's forces quickly captured his opponent's cavalry and artillery. Narváez's forces retreated to the main temple of Cempoala, but attempted to flee as opposing Spanish-native forces prepared to surround it. In the ensuing chaos, Narváez was hit by a pike in the eye, wounding him badly and allowing him to be captured.

During the battle, Xicomecoatl took refuge in Narváez's house, where he was stabbed by one of Narváez's soldiers and badly wounded. After the battle, Cortés, upon being notified of his ally’s wounds, ordered him to be freed and taken to his room for his wounds to be cured.

== Aftermath ==
Narváez was taken prisoner for two years as most of his former troops aligned with Cortés due to the allure of Tenochtitlan's riches. The most immediate fratricidal threat to Cortés' campaign was thwarted, marking a pivotal Cortesian victory in the course of the Spanish-Aztec War. Velázquez, instead of eliminating Cortés as he had planned, essentially replenished and reinforced the army of his nemesis.

1,500 more of the Chinantec warriors summoned by Cortés arrived late and did not partake in the battle. They would be employed instead to watch over Narváez's contingent. It is believed the initial 200 did fight, however.

=== Smallpox outbreak ===
Several of Narváez's soldiers had smallpox and during the battle it spread to some of Cortés's forces, many of whom went to Tenochtitlan, spreading smallpox to the Native Americans. The subsequent epidemic killed millions of Native Americans, possibly even 90% of the indigenous population.
