= Second relation letter from Hernán Cortés to emperor Charles V =

The Second relation letter from Hernán Cortés to emperor Charles V is one of the five Letters of relation written by Hernán Cortés to Charles V, Holy Roman Emperor by his name in the Holy Roman Empire, and to his mother, the queen Joanna of Castile in which he relates his trips to Mexico and the Fall of Mexico-Tenochtitlán. This second letter was dated on 30 October 1520.

== Content ==
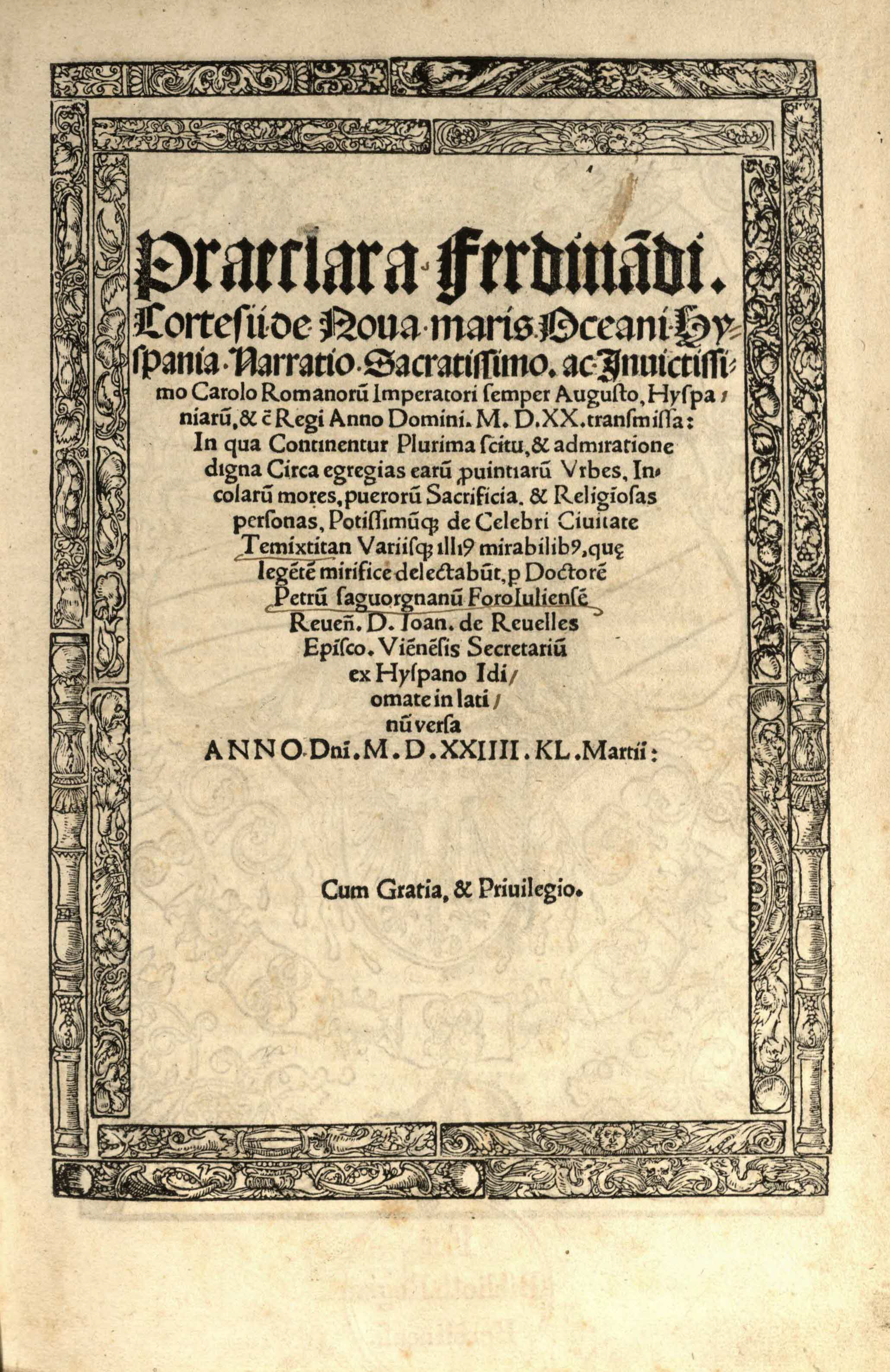
Hernán Cortés - Second and third letters of relation to the emperor Carlos V 1500–1558, where he narrates the events occurred between 30 October 1520 until 15 May 1522

The letter begins with the headline:

Written fifteen months after the First Letter, Cortés informs in the Second letter of relation the previous process to the Fall of Mexico-Tenochtitlán. It began with an apology to the kings for the time he took to write; and continued with the sinking of the brigs to avoid his men regret to go with him and go back to The Spaniard; he exposed his decision to conquer the city and with this justified his expedition. He described the power, wealth and religion of the Mexica. He mentioned the meetings he had with the Tlatoani of Tlaxcala, Xicotencatl and the gold that received from caciques and the Tlatoani Moctezuma II, his impressions when knowing the political conflicts within the territory and his visit to Cholula. Later he noted the conflicts with Moctezuma and his confrontation with the Mexica, the battle that took place in Mexico-Tenochtitlán during his absence, when he left to meet with Pánfilo of Nárvaez, the tlatoani's death and his defeat by Mexica forces. After this, they went to Tlaxcala, where the natives offered him his support to defeat the Mexica. They began to build brigantines to besiege Tenochtitlán in company of more native allies, the conflict with Pedro of Alvarado in the market of Tlatelolco, the sacrifices of the Spaniards, the capture of Cuauhtemoc, the defeat of the Mexica and the fall of Mexico-Tenochtitlán.

== Publications ==
Translator	Printer	Language	Date	Place
Jacobo Cronberger		Spanish	8 November 1522	Seville
Jorge Coci		Spanish	1523	
Michel of Hochstraten		French	1523	
Pietro Savorgnani of Forli	Federico Peypus	Latin	1524	Nuremberg
Pedro Martir			1524	
Nicolás Liburnio		Italian	1524	
		Flemish	1524	Amberes
Sixto Birk and Andrés Diether		German	1550	Augsburg
Simón Grineo			1555 1616	Basilea Rotterdam
