= Juan de Escalante =

Spanish military personnel

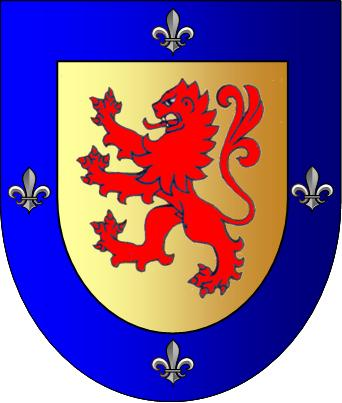
- Arms of the Escalante family
- Born: Circa 1479; Spain
- Died: 10 November 1519; Veracruz, Mexico
- Military career
- Allegiance: Hernán Cortés
- Rank: Ship's captain, Alguazil mayor of Villa Rica de la Vera Cruz
- Conflicts: Battle of Nautla, Veracruz

Juan de Escalante (c. 1479 – 10 November 1519) was a Spanish military man. He joined as a captain on Hernán Cortés' expedition and in 1519 he was commander of the garrison of Veracruz.

== Biography ==
In 1518, he travelled to the Gulf of Mexico under the command of Juan de Grijalva before joining the Cortés expedition. At the beginning of 1519, he was in his forties and commanded a ship which, on the orders of Cortés, reached Havana via the north of the island of Cuba, while the other ten sailed south and Pedro de Alvarado went by land.

On the island of Cozumel, the men explored the new land. As they continued on their way, Juan de Escalante saw that his ship was leaking into the open sea and in danger of sinking; he turned back. Cortés then ordered the entire fleet to return to Cozumel. While Escalante's ship was being repaired, Gerónimo de Aguilar joined his fellow Spaniards. He had been held as a slave by the Maya and later served Cortés well as an interpreter.

As some of the men did not want to participate in an inland campaign, Cortés instructed Juan de Escalante and some other men to destroy the ships and bring the sails, ropes and compasses ashore. In doing so, he deprived his men of the opportunity to return to Cuba.

After forming an alliance with the Totonacs at Cempoala, Cortés founded Villa Rica de la Vera Cruz in August 1519. Cortés made Juan de Escalante his first commander. As he was also appointed alguazil mayor of the city, he was the first European to hold this position in the Americas.

Cortés then moved deeper into the country from Vera Cruz and left Juan de Escalante there with a small Spanish garrison to enforce the peace and strengthen the alliance with the coastal tribes. But the Aztecs of the coast led by a nobleman, Cuahpopoca, demanded tribute from these peoples: their leaders complained to Escalante about the Aztecs' demands and asked him for help. Escalante took 2 cannons, 3 cross-bow men, 2 musketeers and 40 men and over 2000 Totonacs and faced the thousands of Aztecs on the battlefield of Nautla. At his side were two thousand Totonacs who abandoned him at the first opportunity. During this engagement, Escalante was wounded, forced to retreat to Veracruz and died soon after.
