= Qualpopoca =

- Died: November 1519
- Citizenship: Aztec
- Occupations: Aztec administrator and military officer

Qualpopoca (or Quetzalpopoca) was an Aztec administrator and military commander whose operations on behalf of the Aztec Emperor Moctezuma Xocoyotzin against the Spanish conquistadors at Nautla prompted the crisis in Aztec-Spanish relations that provided Hernán Cortés with the pretext he needed to capture Moctezuma and overthrow the Aztec state. Qualpopoca had killed and captured a number of conquistadors in a battle close to Nauhtla after a dispute about tribute, and thus was the first (and one of the very few) Aztec commanders who succeeded against the Spanish. In revenge, Cortes forced the captive Moctezuma to order his arrest, return him to the Aztec capital Tenochtitlan and subsequently burn him alive in front of the Templo Mayor.

== Operations in Nauhtla ==
Qualpopoca first appears in the historical record when he was ordered by the Aztec Emperor Moctezuma Xocoyotzin to take control of the region surrounding the Aztec city of Nautla. Nauhtla was a border city of the Aztec Empire, the garrison there exerting Aztec dominion over the local population, who were largely Totonac in ethnic origin. The province had only recently been added to the Aztec Empire through conquest, and when Hernán Cortés arrived in the region (now the Mexican state of Veracruz) in 1519, one of his first acts was to overthrow Aztec dominion by seizing Aztec tribute collectors in the town of Quiahuiztlan and only returning them after a personal request from the Aztec Emperor. He then routed the Aztec garrison at the town of Tizapancingo and returned the state to the native Totonacs under their leader Tlacochcalcatl of Cempoala.

To restore the province to Aztec control, Moctezuma despatched Qualpopoca with instructions to defeat the Totonacs and their Spanish allies. Arriving in October 1519, Qualpopoca demanded that the Totonac towns pay their regular tribute to the Aztec capital, Tenochtitlan. The towns appealed to the Spanish garrisons at Villa Rica and Veracruz and Juan de Escalante, the conquistador then in command, warned Qualpopoca not to threaten the Totonacs and demanded gold as recompense. Qualpopoca took no notice and continued to organise reprisals against Totonac villages that had not paid tribute. Escalante counterattacked with an army of conquistadors and Totonac warriors and met Qualpopoca in a battle near Nauhtla.

The battle was short, the Totonac forces routing early on and Escalante forced to withdraw under heavy attack, leaving Nauthla in flames. During the retreat, Escalante was mortally wounded, five Spaniards were killed and one, Juan de Argüello, captured. As was traditional in Aztec society, Argüello and the captured Totonacs were sacrificed, the Spaniard's head being sent to Moctezuma as a trophy. Cortes later suggested in a letter, as justification for the death of Qualpopoca, that these men were not killed or captured in battle, but rather had been sent by the Spanish as emissaries and guides to Qualpopoca who had had them seized and sacrificed.

== Intrigues in Tenochtitlan ==
When word of the battle reached Tenochtitlan on 14 November 1519, there was consternation. Hernán Cortés and his force of 300 conquistadors and several thousand Totonac and Tlaxcalan allies had reached the city a week earlier and were living in one of the city's palaces as guests of Moctezuma. The presence of the Spanish and their traditional enemies the Tlaxcalans caused unease in the city, especially following their massacre of the population of Cholula a few weeks earlier. News of the battle at Nauhtla, accompanied by the arrival of Argüello's head, alarmed the Aztec government that it might provoke the Spanish or their allies into an attack on the city's nobility as had happened at Cholula. The head was sent away and Moctezuma agreed to a private meeting with Cortes.

Cortes arrived with 35 armed men and, after a brief preamble, informed Moctezuma that he would either join the Spanish in their accommodation as a hostage or he would be killed on the spot along with his advisors and attendants. Despite arguing and pleading with Cortes, Moctezuma eventually submitted to the Spanish and, with his principal advisors, moved to the Spanish accommodation where he became a prisoner in all but name. Although allowed to continue to rule as before, all of Moctezuma's proclamations, correspondence and movements were controlled by Cortes.

== Death of Qualpopoca ==
"I often pause to consider the heroic actions of that time. I seem to see the present before my eyes; and I believe that we performed them not of our own volition but by the guidance of God. For what soldiers in the world, numbering only four hundred – and we were even fewer – would have dared to enter a city such as Mexico . . . and, having seized so great a prince, execute his captains before his eyes?"
The Conquest of New Spain, Bernal Díaz del Castillo.

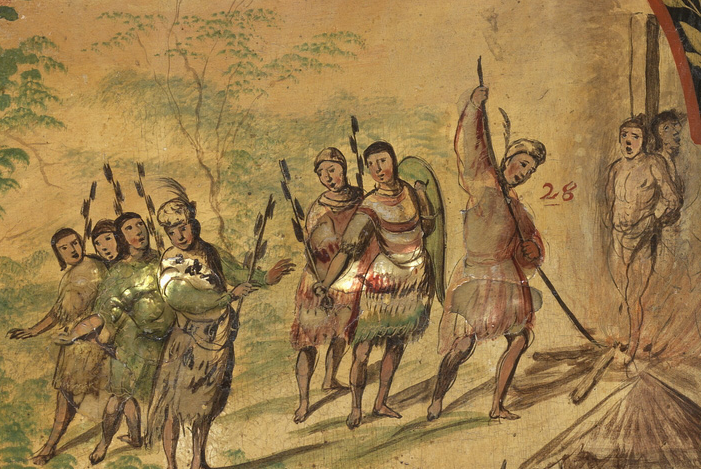
Representation of the execution of Qualpopoca by the new Spanish artists Juan González and Miguel González, 1698

One of the first actions of the new prisoner emperor was to order the arrest of Qualpopoca, two of his sons and 15 other Aztec nobles. These men were brought to Tenochtitlan where Moctezuma gave them to Cortes. Under questioning, Qualpopoca insisted that he had been acting on his own initiative when attacking Escalante but later changed his story, possibly under torture, to claim that Moctezuma had deliberately ordered him to wage war on the Spanish. Cortes informed Moctezuma of this and told him that although he considered the Emperor guilty of ordering the attack on Escalante's men, Cortes would protect him from harm.

Cortes then brought a shackled Moctezuma out into the great plaza in front of the Templo Mayor and made him watch, along with thousands of citizens of Tenochtitlan, as Qualpopoca, his sons and the fifteen other prisoners were tied to stakes, surrounded with bundles or arrows and wooden weapons from the Aztec armouries and burnt to death. According to some accounts, the crowd watched the spectacle in total silence and when the prisoners were dead, Cortes told Moctezuma he could go free. Terrified by the anger of his subjects following this public execution of one of his most senior officers, Moctezuma refused. Over the next few months the Aztec Emperor would gradually lose the respect of his people, culminating in his death on the Noche Triste on 30 June 1520.
