= Navalmanzano =

- Municipality
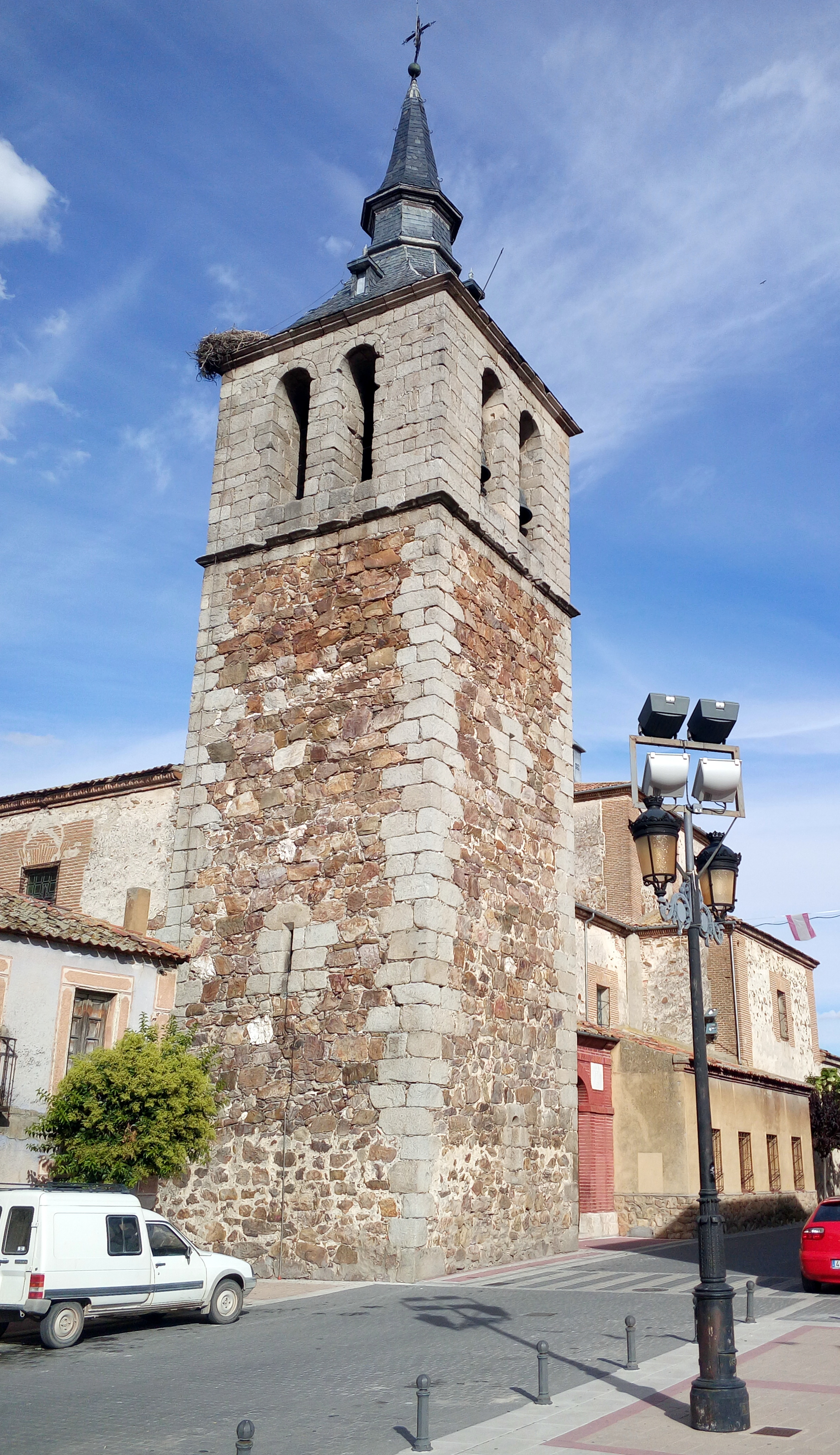

- Flag Coat of arms

- Location in Spain. Navalmanzano (Spain)
- Coordinates: 41°12′56″N 4°15′26″W
- Country: Spain
- Autonomous community: Castile and León
- Province: Segovia
- Municipality: Navalmanzano

Area
  - Total: 32 km^{2} (12 sq mi)

Population (2025-01-01)
  - Total: 1,041
  - Density: 33/km^{2} (84/sq mi)
- Time zone: UTC+1 (CET)
  - Summer (DST): UTC+2 (CEST)
- Website: Official website

Navalmanzano is a municipality located in the province of Segovia, Castile and León, Spain. According to the 2004 census (INE), the municipality has a population of 1,157 inhabitants.

The area of Navalmanzano is 32,79 km².

== Notable people ==
- Pánfilo de Narváez, born in 1470. Conquistador.
