= Governorate of Cuba =

1511–1607 Spanish colony

Governorate of Cuba Gobernación de Cuba
- 1511–1607
- Flag Coat of arms

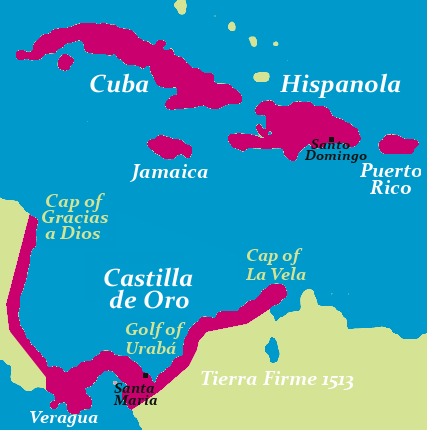
- Islands and the Province of Tierra Firme in 1513
- Status: Governorate of the Spanish Empire
- Capital: Nuestra Señora de la Asunción de Baracoa
- Official languages: Spanish
- Common languages: Taíno; Guanahatabey
- Religion: Roman Catholicism; Judaism
- Government: Monarchy
- List of Castilian monarchs
- Historical era: Spanish Empire
  - Established: 1511
  - Elevated into a Captaincy General: 1607
- Currency: Spanish dollar
Succeeded by
Captaincy General of Cuba
- Today part of: Cuba; Guantanamo Bay Naval Base

Since the 16th century the island of Cuba had been under the control of the governor-captain general of Santo Domingo. The conquest of Cuba was organized in 1510 by the recently restored Viceroy of the Indies, Diego Colón, under the command of Diego Velázquez de Cuéllar, who became Cuba's first governor until his death in 1524.

Velázquez founded the city of Nuestra Señora de la Asunción de Baracoa in 1511 and convoked a general cabildo (a local government council) to govern Cuba, which was authorized by Ferdinand II of Aragon.

Cuba was elevated into the Captaincy General of Cuba in 1607.
