= Cempoala =

Mesoamerican archaeological site in Veracruz, Mexico

Coordinates: 19°26′42″N 96°24′32″W

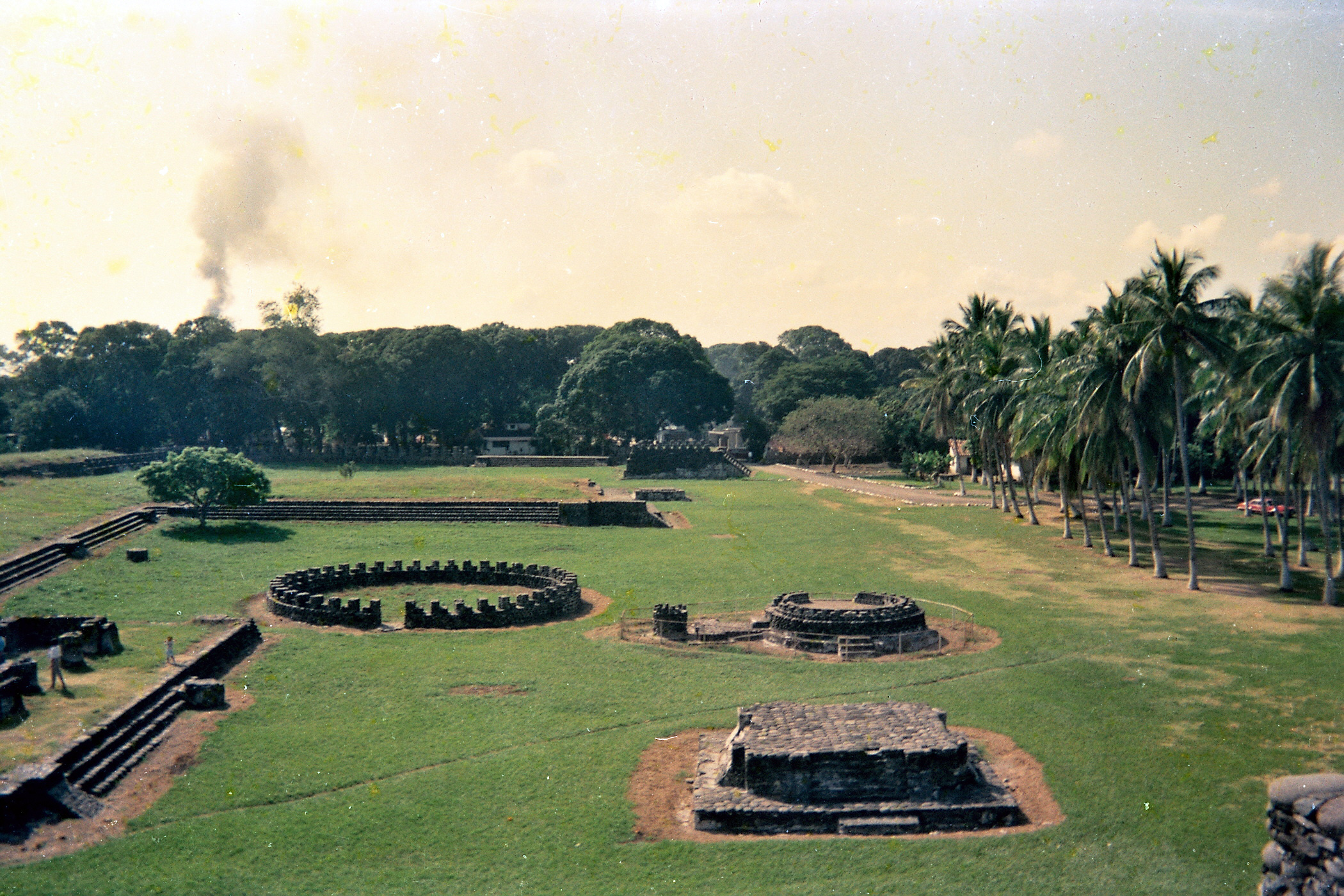
View of Cempoala from one of the temples

The location of Cempoala within Central Mexico

Cempoala or Zempoala (Nahuatl Cēmpoalātl 'Place of Twenty Waters') is an important Mesoamerican archaeological site in the municipality of Úrsulo Galván in the Mexican state of Veracruz. It lies on the flat coastal plain, located one kilometer from the shore of the Actopan River and six kilometres from the coast of the Gulf of Mexico. It was the first urban settlement the Spaniards saw upon their arrival on the mainland of North America.

Cempoala was one of the most important settlements of the Totonac people during the Mesoamerican Postclassic period. The Totonacs ruled the area of Totonacapan which consisted of the northern part of Veracruz together with the Zacatlán district of Puebla. In the early sixteenth century, this area had a total population of approximately 250,000 and contained some 50 towns. At its peak, Cempoala had a population of between 25,000 and 30,000. The economy of Cempoala was largely based on marine resources and lowland agriculture. The town was settled around walled perimeters delimiting temples and palaces; dating back to the 11th to 16th centuries.

== Etymology ==
The word "Cēmpoalli" (from Nahuatl root "Cēmpoal) means twenty and "ā(tl)", means water, hence "twenty waters". An alternative etymology suggests the name meant “Abundant Water”. Both versions imply that the city had many aqueducts which fed the numerous gardens and surrounding farmland fields. A third version conjectures that the name referred to commercial activities which, according to some sources, were performed every 20 days in pre-Hispanic times.

== History ==
According to some sources, the city was founded at least 1,500 years before the arrival of the Spanish, and there is evidence of Olmec influence. Although not much is known about the Preclassic and Classic eras, the Preclassic town was built on mounds to protect it from floods. The Totonacs moved onto this coastal plain during the height of the Toltec Empire (A.D. 1000–1150). Archaeologists believe the Toltecs had pushed the Totonacs out of their settlements on the eastern slopes of the Sierra Madre Oriental and down to the coast. However, Agustín García Márquez has proposed that Cempoala was a Nahua altepetl, with a particular influence from Olmeca-Xicallanca migrating from Cholula.

=== Aztec conquest ===
Cempoala and other coastal Veracruz locations were defeated by the Aztec armies of Moctezuma I (mid-15th century), who was drawn to the area by local marine resources. They were heavily taxed and coerced into sending hundreds of people as tribute for sacrifices and to be used as household and agricultural slaves. This treatment at the hands of the Aztecs created the situation which led up to the defeat of the Aztecs by Cortés in the 16th century.

=== Alliance with the Spaniards ===
In 1519, the Spanish party led by Hernán Cortés at the malaria-ridden camp of San Juan de Ulúa heard of a nearby town called Zempoala. Cortés marched to Cempoala with 500 conquistadors and sent word of their arrival. They were met by 20 Zempoalan dignitaries, and in town, they met with the tlatoani Xicomecoatl (called Cacique Gordo or "Fat Chief" by the Spanish), who fed them and gave them quarters. The Totonac presented Cortés with numerous gifts, including gold jewelry. By this time, Cempoala had been suffering from Aztec domination for several years, and Xicomecoatl made many complaints against the Aztec Empire and the great Montezuma. Cortés promised to alleviate his concerns. At Quiahuiztlan (another Totonac town to the north of Cempoala), the Spaniards and Totonacs forged their alliance against the Aztecs.

The Spaniards and Totonacs shared the same goal. In August 1519, Cortés and 40 Totonac captains, which by a lower estimate equates to around 8000 soldiers, and 400 porters embarked upon a long journey into the highlands to Tenochtitlan, using the same routes used to transport maize. The effort ended with the fall of Tenochtitlan and Moctezuma II, the Aztec tlatoani, being taken hostage.

On 27 May 1520, the Battle of Cempoala was fought here between the forces of Pánfilo de Narváez and the forces of Hernán Cortés, the latter being supported by a small number of indigenous soldiers.

=== Colonial period ===
The Spaniards called Cempoala Villa Viciosa ("fertile town") for its many festivals, vast orchards, and gardens and the festive and joyful character of its inhabitants. It was later known as New Seville for its resemblance, as per the Spaniards, with the Iberian town.

After the victory and conquest, the people of Cempoala were relocated, Christianized, banned from practicing their ancient cults, and were enslaved to work new Spanish sugar cane fields. Between 1575 and 1577 a smallpox (matlazahuatl) epidemic decimated the population. It is estimated that two million people lost their lives in Mesoamerica due to this epidemic. The city was totally abandoned, and the few survivors moved to the city of Xalapa. The city was then lost to history until archaeologist Francisco del Paso y Troncoso rediscovered it.

== Site ==
The Cempoala complex site is an assembly of impressive public spaces and fortress-like buildings surrounded by vegetation. The structures were built with stones from the nearby river, joined with mortar, and covered with lime made from burning shells and snails. This added a silver-like luster to their appearance when viewed from a distance.

As the political-religious center of the city, it included the "Place of accounts", as it was referred by the Mexica rulers, because it was where taxes and tributes from the region were collected.

Structures with often overlooked historic importance are in the part of the site now known as walled system IV. It was here that Cortés successfully faced the forces of Pánfilo de Narváez, thus consolidating his leadership in the colonization of the Mexican territory.

=== Structures ===
The main structures at Cempoala include the following:

- Templo del Sol (Sun Temple; Great Pyramid)

This temple is built on the same platform as the Templo Mayor, separated by an ample square. This is probably the most impressive structure of the site. The great temple resembles the Sun Temple in Tenochtitlan. The Temple of Quetzalcoatl (the Feathered Serpent) is a square platform, and the Temple of Ehecatl (the wind god) is round.

- Templo Mayor (Great Temple)

The top part is surrounded by battlements.

- Templo de las Chimeneas (Chimney Temple)

It has a series of semicircular pillars 1.5 meters high, because of this peculiar shape, the building is named.

- El Pimiento (The Pepper)

It has a three bodied structure, its most notable feature is its exterior decor based on skulls representations.

- Moctezuma's Palace
- Templo de la Cruz (Temple of the Cross)

This temple contains some fresco mural sections with celestial motifs.

- Templo Las Caritas (Temple of the Faces)

The so-called Temple of Charity standing about 200 meters to the east is a two-tier structure decorated with fragments of stucco reliefs. It is named for the hundreds of stucco skulls that once adorned the facade of a small structure at the base of the temple's staircase-archaeologists believe this complex was dedicated to the god of death.

It consists of two overlaid basements with top side elements, an open room, two decorative belts, the lower has murals depicting the sun, Moon and Venus, as early morning star, the higher section has a large amount of clay “little faces” or little skulls. The Structure is decorated with stucco faces on the walls and hieroglyphs painted in lower sections Gran Pirámide and the wind god Ehécatl worship altar.

- Other Mounds

There are other mounds, unexcavated, that cannot be visited, located within Cempoala current houses. Some of the structures there are probably built in the same style as were the residences of the prehispanic commoners.

== Astronomy in Cempoala ==
Some research by Vincent H. Malmström of Dartmouth College describes an interesting astronomical relationship that exists because of the three round rings found at Zempoala:

Beneath the massive pyramid (north eastern corner) in the central plaza of Zempoala, are three puzzling stone rings, each made from rounded beach cobbles jointed together to make small, stepped pillars. The largest rings has 40 stepped pillars, the middle ring has 28, and the smaller ring 13, around its circumference. It seems that three rings were used to calibrate different astronomical cycles, possibly by placing a marker or an idol from one pillar to the next, day after day.

The stone rings viewed from the top of the main pyramid, are surmounted by 13, 28, and 40 step like pillars, might have been counting devices to keep track of eclipse cycles, by Totonac priests.

It is possible that by using the rings, Totonac priests were able to calibrate movements of the moon. There are reasons to believe these rings provide further evidence of the intellectual curiosity and architectural ingenuity of the early Mesoamericans.

== See also ==
- Totonac culture
- Totonac
- Xicomecoatl
