= María de Estrada =

Spanish conquistadora

María de Estrada (c. 1475 or 1486 – between 1537–48) was a Spanish woman who was part of Hernán Cortés's expedition to Mexico between 1519 and 1524, in which she traveled as a conquistador and fought against the Aztec Empire. It's also purported that she had previously spent several years as a castaway among the indigenous peoples of pre-colonial Cuba.

== Background ==
María de Estrada (the surname is given as Destrada or Estrada in some sources) was born in Seville, Spain, although her father came originally from northern Spain. Her brother, the conquistador Francisco de Estrada, had accompanied Christopher Columbus as a cabin boy, and when he returned to the New World to settle permanently in 1509, Maria probably travelled with him.

== Castaway in Cuba ==
According to a widely accepted identification, María joined an early expedition to the Gulf of Darién, perhaps accompanying her brother or an unrecorded husband. Their attempt to establish a settlement was a failure, and on the return journey to Santo Domingo, her vessel was shipwrecked on the island of Cuba.

At first, the locals treated the marooned Spanish crew well, helping them to travel along the coast; but at the place later known as Matanzas, the castaways were betrayed and massacred. The woman identified as Maria de Estrada was one of a handful of survivors, taken captive by one of the local chiefs who had led the attack.

For several years, she lived among the natives, one of the first Europeans to become acculturated to indigenous life in the Americas. In 1513, she was released thanks to the arrival of conquistadors on the island. Soon afterwards, she married one of these Spanish colonists, named Pedro Sánchez Farfán.

== Cortés expedition to Mexico ==
In 1519, Pedro Sánchez Farfán joined the expedition of Hernán Cortés, and fought in the initial Spanish conquest of the Aztec Empire, but it is not clear whether his wife went with him. Some modern sources indicate that María de Estrada only arrived on the mainland in April 1520, with the rival expedition of Pánfilo de Narváez, which included her brother Francisco, and which joined forces with Cortés at the end of May 1520.

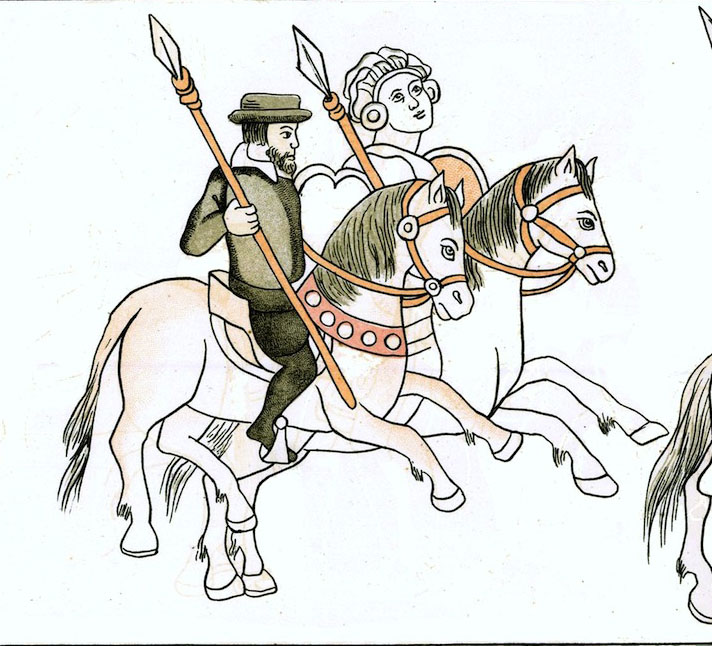
Possible depiction of María de Estrada along with Hernán Cortés. History of Tlaxcala.

María was certainly with the combined army after it returned to the native capital at Tenochtitlan in June 1520: according to Bernal Díaz del Castillo, she was the only Spanish woman with them at this point. There had been the bloody unrest in Cortés' absence, and now the conquistadors were struck by a full-scale native revolt known as the Noche Triste: after a week of street battles, the army was forced to fight its way back out of the city, suffering heavy casualties and losing most of its baggage and artillery.

Most of the early sources refer to María de Estrada in general terms among the small number of women who accompanied the army at this time, but a handful of writers of the later sixteenth century single her out as a soldier. The Tlaxcallan chronicler Diego Muñoz Camargo wrote that she fought her way out of the city as a rodelero during the battle, proving herself "as good a warrior as any man", and that she participated in the decisive charge of armored cavalry at the Battle of Otumba. For their part, historians Fray Juan de Torquemada and Francisco Cervantes de Salazar also describe those feats, adding that she participated in the Siege of Tenochtitlan along with other women soldiers and nurses, like Isabel Rodríguez, Beatriz de Palacios and Beatriz Bermúdez de Velasco. Furthermore, Dominican historian Diego Durán claims that she led a force of conquistadors into the area around Popocatépetl, where she defeated the Nahua Indians of Hueyapan, charging head first and screaming "Santiago!"

Cortés certainly gave María and her husband an extensive encomienda in this area, based at Tetela del Volcán, with subsidiary units at Nepopoalco and at Hueyapan itself, while Sánchez Farfán also gained additional estates further to the west. When she was widowed in the 1530s, María de Estrada assumed direct control of the estate, and in this capacity, she filed a petition to the king of Spain to ask for lighter taxation of her lands. Eventually, María de Estrada remarried to Alonso Martín, a civilian settler in Puebla, but by 1561, his relatives were fighting over the inheritance: instead, the encomienda was annexed to the royal domains of the king of Spain as it seems that neither María nor her first husband had surviving descendants.

== Academic perspectives ==
The basic fact that María de Estrada accompanied Cortés' army to Mexico is vouched for by eyewitness memoirs and most historians agree as to the reliability of the evidence on which her detailed biography is based.

Luisa Campuzano, in the fullest discussion of the problem, concluded that the sources support each other, and provide a consistent factual and psychological portrait, but other historians have been more cautious, suggesting that María de Estrada's military prowess may be a literary fiction, and inferring that she arrived in the New World too late to be the castaway rescued in 1513. A later date for her arrival in the Americas would imply that María de Estrada was Sanchéz Farfán's second wife, a different woman from the castaway he had married in Cuba, although the sources providing these dates seem to be unaware of his earlier marriage.

== See also ==
- List of people from Morelos
