= Beatriz González (nurse) =

Spanish nurse

Beatriz González (16th century) was a member of the expedition of Hernán Cortés to Mexico. Born in Spain, her date of birth and of death are unknown, but her name has been preserved due to her exceptional courage while supporting the Spanish conquerors and their allied Amerindian troops as a nurse.

She was particularly active during the siege of Tenochtitlan, where she arrived following the troops of Pánfilo de Narvaez, and during the conquest of Pánuco. By the end of her life she fell out of luck and needed to ask the Crown of Spain for subsidies. To do so she alleged her services as a nurse and explorer during the conquest of Mexico. Her petition was granted.

== Spanish nurses during the Conquest ==
All women who joined the expedition—and there were many—had to work as battlefield nurses regardless of their race or social position. They treated the wounds with herbs and oil, and when oil was missing they used melted animal fat. This practice was started by Isabel Rodríguez. Thanks to the chronicle of the conquistadors we know the name of some of the bravest female nurses, like Beatriz Palacios, Juana Mansilla, María Estrada and Beatriz Muñoz.
