= Otumba (disambiguation) =

Otumba is a municipality in the State of Mexico, Mexico

Otumba may also refer to:

- Otumba de Gómez Farías, a town and the municipal seat of Otumba municipality, State of Mexico
- Otompan, a pre-Columbian altepetl
- Battle of Otumba, a 1520 battle in the Spanish conquest of the Aztec Empire
