= Francisco de Aguilar (conquistador) =

Spanish conquistador

Francisco de Aguilar (1479 — 1571?), born Alonso de Aguilar, was a Spanish conquistador who took part in the expedition led by Hernán Cortés that resulted in the conquest of the Aztec Empire and the fall of Tenochtitlan, the capital of the Aztec state in the central Mexican plateau.

== Biography ==
Francisco de Aguilar was born in Villalba de los Barros, in Extremadura, the son of Pedro de Aguilar and Elvira de la Torre. According to some reconstructions, he was born around 1479 or 1481. On 2 December 1512, at the age of thirty-three, he obtained a license to travel to the Indies together with his brother Alonso. By 1518, both were in Cuba, where they enlisted in the expedition organized by Hernán Cortés.

Aguilar took part in the conquest of Mexico from its earliest stages: he was sent to Zempoala, participated in the fighting against the Tlaxcaltecs, witnessed the Cholula massacre, and accompanied the entry into Tenochtitlán. In the city he was charged with guarding Moctezuma II during his imprisonment and was with him on the roof of the palace of Axayácatl at the moment of the ruler’s death, during which Aguilar himself was wounded. He also took part in the defeat of Pánfilo de Narváez, the escape during the Noche Triste, and the Battle of Otumba. After the fall of Tenochtitlán, he received an encomienda and became the owner of a venta on the road between Veracruz and Mexico City. The presence of two different Aguilars—Francisco and Alonso—led some chroniclers and historians to confuse their lives, attributing the deeds of both to a single individual.

He was granted an encomienda after the conquest, but in 1529, eight years after the fall of Tenochtitlan, he gave up his encomienda and entered the Dominican Order, adopting the name Francisco. Aguilar spent the remaining 40 years of his life as a Dominican friar. According to Patricia de Fuente, who translated his account to English, Aguilar "was contemplative by nature, and ... he brooded about the moral aspect of the Conquest."

Around 1531, at about fifty years of age, Francisco abandoned secular life and entered the Order of Preachers under the guidance of friar Domingo de Betanzos. As a friar he lived for more than forty years, dedicating himself to the evangelization of Indigenous peoples and leading an austere life marked by penance and by a severe form of gout that left him infirm in his later decades. In his elderly years, he was diagnosed with gout and he soon died in Mexico at the age of 92.

== Works ==
Late in his long life, in his early 80s, his fellow Dominicans urged him to write an account of the Aztec conquest drawing from his experiences. This account, known as Relación breve de la conquista de la Nueva España ("Brief Record [Account] of the Conquest of New Spain"), went unpublished in his lifetime, however a manuscript copy of it was preserved at the royal library of El Escorial outside of Madrid, Spain. It was first published in 1900 by the Mexican historian and archivist, Francisco del Paso y Troncoso. A modern English translation of Aguilar's chronicle is published in The Conquistadors: First-Person Accounts of the Conquest of Mexico,
