= Broken spear =

Broken spear may refer to:

- Lance corporal, lancia spezzata, literally "broken lance" or "broken spear", the presumed origin of the rank
- The Broken Spears: The Aztec Account of the Conquest of Mexico (Spanish title: Visión de los vencidos: Relaciones indígenas de la conquista), a book by Miguel León-Portilla, translating selections of Nahuatl-language accounts of the Spanish conquest of the Aztec Empire, first published in Spanish in 1959, and in English in 1962

== See also ==
- Broken Arrow (nuclear), an accidental event that involves nuclear weapons or nuclear components but which does not create the risk of nuclear war
- Bent Spear, other nuclear weapons incidents that are of significant interest
