= Beatriz de Palacios =

African-Spanish woman soldier in the Spanish army

Beatriz de Palacios was a Spanish woman soldier, nurse and explorer of African and Spanish descent who took part in the Spanish conquest of the Aztec Empire. She is widely considered to be one of the first people of African ancestry to set foot in the new world.

== Biography ==
Nicknamed "La Parda" due to the tone of her skin (Parda being a term for a woman of mixed ancestry, typically African–Europe–Native American), she arrived to the new world with the expedition of Pánfilo de Narváez along with her husband, a Spaniard named Pedro de Escobar, and her father, Cristobal Palacios. She is mentioned by Francisco Cervantes de Salazar and Bernal Díaz del Castillo among other famous conquerors who often express admiration towards her. Her date of birth is not clear.

She served as a nurse under the command of Isabel Rodríguez, but also fought at the front lines in battle, often taking over the guard duties in place of her husband whenever he was too tired. She tended to his wounds and the wounds of others, saddled the horses, took care of the weapons, and did everything just like any other soldier.

Palacios served with honor during La Noche Triste, helping the Spanish troops evacuate Tenochtitlan, and later took part in the retaking of the city. Both she and her husband survived the conquest and established a family in Cuba.

== See also ==
- Beatriz González
- Isabel Rodríguez
- Juana Mansilla
