= Francisco de Aguilar =

Francisco de Aguilar may refer to:

- Francisco de Aguilar (conquistador) (1479–1571?), Spanish conquistador and later Dominican friar, participant in the conquest of the Aztec Empire
- Francisco de Aguilar (politician) (fl. 1850s), 19th century Honduran politician and one-time interim president (1855–56)
