= Tlaltecatzin =

Tlaltecatzin, according to some sources, was a son of the Aztec tlatoani Moctezuma II. In the Noche Triste ("Night of Sorrows"), the Spanish took him out of Tenochtitlan as a prisoner along with other Aztec noblemen, including his brother Chimalpopoca. The Aztecs attacked the Spanish party, and both Tlaltecatzin and Chimalpopoca were killed.

According to another source, Tlaltecatzin was a Tepanec prince who guided the Spaniards, and was killed on the Night of Sorrows.
