= La relación =

La relación or relación may refer to:

- La relación de Álvar Núñez Cabeza de Vaca
- Relación de las cosas de Yucatán
- Relación breve de la conquista de la Nueva España
- Relación
