= Juana Mansilla =

Early female participant in the Spanish conquest

Juana Mansilla (fl. 1508–1528), was one of the first women known to participate in the conquest of Mexico. She was a Spanish colonist, noblewoman, battlefield-nurse and alleged-witch of the 16th century.

Bernal Diaz del Castillo includes her in the group of "exceptional women" he extols for their bravery and intelligence along with Isabel Rodríguez, La Malinche, María Estrada, Beatriz Bermúdez de Velasco, and others.

== Biography ==
She arrived to America in 1508, along with her husband, Alonso Valiente, Hernan Cortés´s cousin, and with other conquerors and their wives, to help develop the settlement there. We have no records in her specific work during the foundation or development of the colony, as is the case for most of the women that accompanied Columbus and the Spanish conquerors, but we have vague records of their role as the main settlers and the impressive development that settlements underwent in the absence of most of the men. The role of Masilla and of the women who traveled with her and their husbands in Mexico was comparable to the role of women in the American conquest of the west. Due to her crucial role in the foundation and development of the city of Puebla de los Angeles, founded by her husband, she has been referred in Cruz's biographies of historical figures of Puebla as "The Great Lady of the 16th Century".

in 1520 she accompanied Cortes-and her husband- during part in their explorations. She played a very active role as a ¨"field doctor" during the bloody battles of the siege of Tenochtitlan.

In 1525 Cortes left with his men and many native allies to a new conquest expedition. He left Gonzalo de Salazar in charge of the settlement of Puebla. Juana also remained in Puebla, along with most of the women. Both Bernal Diaz del Castillo and Francisco López de Gómara narrate how Salazar tried to persuade the wives of the conquerors that their husbands are dead and they must all remarry. Juana refused to believe this news without proof, and resisted the attempts of Salazar to take over the power of the region. When she is pressured to marry another man she refuses and persuades other women to follow her lead. For this, and according to López and to Diaz del Castillo, Salazar chose to humiliate her by whipping her in the public plaza. To have an excuse to do so he accuses her of witchcraft, an accusation that most of the city does not believe. Juana resisted until the return of Cortes and his men, who were indeed alive.

"The Following was the method which Estrada adopted to honor this injured woman; the whole of the cavaliers were ordered to mount their horses, he himself placing Juana Mansilla on his saddle behind him, and in this way at the head of the cavalgade he paraded the streets of the city. "This woman" he said " has behaved like the Roman Matrons of old, wherefore the insults which have been offered to her person by the factor should now be made to exalt her in the eyes of all honest men"''.

Despite her status as colonial heroine and her reputation of "woman of character", her husband fell madly in love with the native American María Monctezuma. He repudiated Juana and forced a priest at gunpoint to marry him to María since the priest refused to accept his reasons to repudiate Juana. Unsurprisingly, his reasons to repudiate Juana were considered invalid by the Pope too, and his marriage to María was forcefully dissolved.

Juana didn't forgive her husband's betrayal. She left Alonso alone in the new world and returned to Spain in 1528.
