= Otumba de Gómez Farías =

Otumba de Gómez Farías Otumba
- Town
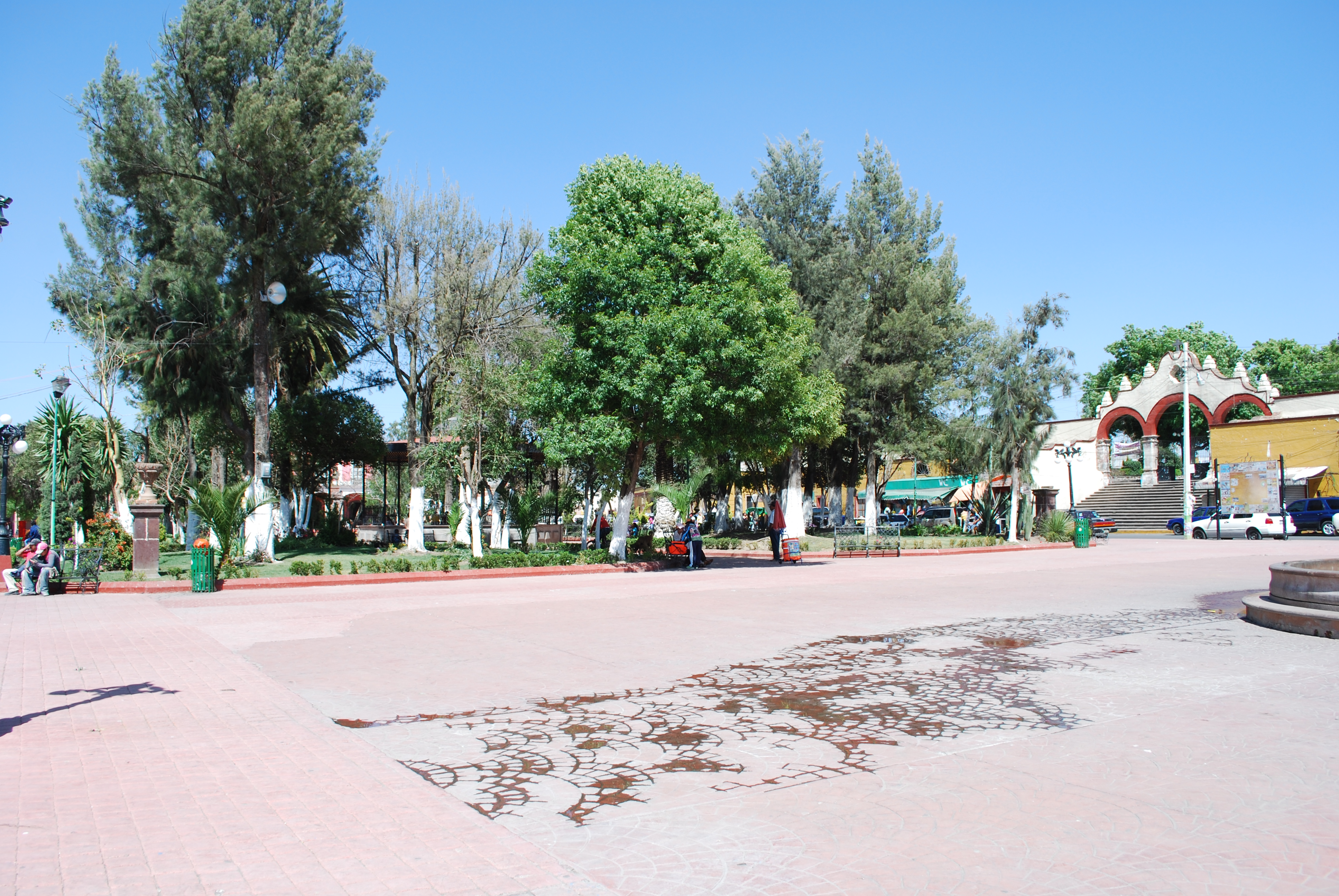
- Main plaza

- Coat of arms

- Location within Mexico
- Coordinates: 19°41′56″N 98°45′26″W
- Country: Mexico
- State: State of Mexico
- Municipality: Otumba
- Founded: 1200s
- Elevation (of seat): 2,360 m (7,740 ft)

Population (2005)
- 9,242
- Time zone: UTC-6 (Central (US Central))
- Postal code (of seat): 55900
- Website: www.otumba.com/portal/ (in Spanish)

Otumba or Otumba de Gómez Farías is a town and municipal seat of the municipality of Otumba located in the northeast of the State of Mexico, just northeast of Mexico City. Historically, this area is best known as the site of the Battle of Otumba and as an important crossroads during the colonial period where incoming viceroys ceremoniously were handed power by their predecessors. Today, it is a rural municipality undergoing changes as urbanization arrives here from the Mexico City area. However, one element from the past that is still remembered is that of burros or donkeys. During the colonial period, Otumba was an important market for the animals, and they are still culturally important. Each year, the municipality sponsors a Feria de Burros or Donkey Fair, where the animals star in fashion shows, costume contests, and races. There is also a donkey sanctuary for unwanted animals.

The name Otumba comes from Nahuatl and means "place of otomis." The appendage "Gómez Farías" was added in honor of Valentín Gómez Farías. The Aztec glyph for the area depicts an Otomi character with the sign meaning place. The municipality is represented by this glyph and by a Spanish coat of arms.

In 2023, Otumba was designated a Pueblo Mágico by the Mexican government, recognizing its cultural and historical importance.

== History ==
This area was most likely settled by the Otomi although it is said that these Otomi descended from the Chichimeca. A series of villages were established in this area in the Classic period between 200 and 900 AD with the first known ruler being Motolina. When the chiefdom of Xaltocan fell in 1200, many other Otomis came to take refuge here, founding the town.

The area came under the rule of Azcapotzalco during the reign of Tezozomoc. Aztec rule was established here by Nezahualcoyotl from Texcoco, who made Otumba a regional capital, serving as a point of collection for tribute. As an Aztec city, it contained a sacred plaza with a temple and perhaps a lord's palace. Outside this plaza area was the residential area for the elite called the pipiltin, consisting of large houses occupied by extended families. There was probably also a central market. Outside of that was a second residential zone for the common population, called the macehualtin. The organization of the city reflected that of Texcoco but at a smaller scale. There is evidence that this city produced crafts such as ceramics on a large scale.

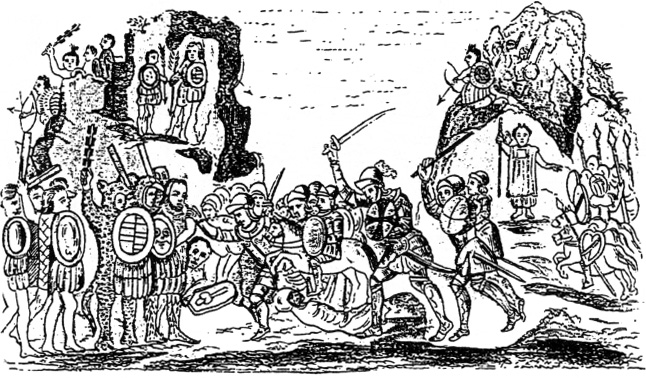
Battle of Otumba

The Battle of Otumba is part of the story of the fall of Tenochtitlan, specifically La Noche Triste. The Spanish had to flee the Aztec capital and reach Tlaxcalan, where they would find allies. After being beleaguered on the causeway leading out of the city, Hernán Cortés fled towards Tlaxcala, and was intercepted by a group of warriors of the Tenocha, Tepanec, Xochimilca, and other peoples. However, despite the fact that they had already seen horses, seeing Spanish knights in full regalia proved to have shock value, as the warriors had never seen such in open battle. The fight lasted for four hours until Cortés attacked a warrior named Cihuacóatl Matlatzincatzin, the tallest and most adorned of the attackers. He and thirteen knights charged the army's leader and killed him. This charge broke the natives’ ranks and they fled. This battle gives Otumba the denomination of "La Heroica Otumba." Despite the poor condition and heavy losses of the Spanish army and the overwhelming number of Aztec warriors, the Spanish prevailed and were able to reach Tlaxcala to regroup. Some 20,000 Aztecs were killed. While the town lends its name to this battle, it really occurred in a place called Temalacatitlán.

After the battle, people from Otumba and other surrounding areas sent ambassadors to Cortes to ask forgiveness for fighting against him with the Aztecs. The ambassador from Tenochtitlan, however, still expressed the city's opposition to him. Cortes had the natives from Otumba capture the ambassador from Tenochtitlan for him as proof of their loyalty.

After the Spanish conquest of the Aztec Empire, Cortes passed through here a second time sometime later to visit mines in Pachuca. The Spanish divided Otumba into among a number of encomiendas, many of which belonged to Cortes himself. When Cortes went to Spain in 1528, the Otumba area was seized by Nuño de Guzmán who declared it a province of the crown, along with a number of other areas. When Cortes returned, he retook Otumba and installed his son Martín Cortés as tribute collector.

For the rest of the colonial period, Otumba was an important stopping point on the royal roads that connected Mexico City with Puebla, Hidalgo and especially the port of Veracruz. It was also the place where incoming viceroys would meet their predecessors and receive the scepter of rule before entering Mexico City itself. Because of the road traffic, the town grew into an important commercial center for the rest of the colonial period.

During the Mexican War of Independence, one important insurgent, Eugenio Montaño, was from Otumba. He, along with José Francisco Osorno, fought mostly in the Apan area until 1813, when the royalist forces battled his troops near Calpulalpan. Montaño lost and his body was found by the royalists at the Tepetates Hacienda. Looking for vengeance, the royalists cut off Montaño's head and cut the rest of the body into four pieces. The head was sent to his family and the body parts were hung in at the four corners of his house in Otumba. The parish priest tried to bury the body in at the church but the royalist dug it back up and rehung the pieces. A short time later, the body was permanently interred in the baptistery of the church.

Here Guadalupe Victoria proclaimed his Montano Plan in 1827. Here also, Nicolás Bravo was proclaimed the president of Mexico in 1839.

For much of its colonial history, Otumba had been a district seat of one type or another. Its current status of municipality was established in 1821. In 1861, it was officially declared a town. A rail line was constructed through here in the late 19th century and the municipal palace was constructed in 1890. A second rail line would be constructed in the mid 20th century. The train station would become the scene of some important incidents of the Mexican Revolution. In 1915, General Rodolfo Fierro, allied with Francisco Villa, seized the local telegraph station and sent orders in Álvaro Obregón's name to that General's troops to perform maneuvers that were beneficial to the Villa army. Another occurrence was an attack on a train called El Dorado, which was carrying Venustiano Carranza. The attack was carried out by forces loyal to Alvaro Obregon, but did not succeed in killing Carranza.

Ángel María Garibay K., who was a noted linguist, humanist and canon law expert, was the parish priest of Otumba from 1932 to 1941. While stationed here he wrote a number of important works.

== Today ==
Today, the municipality of Otumba is in transition towards a more urban area. Crime rates have risen as well as the frustrations of the local populace. In 2006, police intervened to prevent the public lynching of a 15-year-old who was caught trying to steal a computer and chair from a distance education center in the community of San Marcos Ahuatepec.

In 2008, Sergio Cid Arandas was kidnapped from his home in Ecatepec and found dead on the highway between Otumba and Ciudad Sahagún. The body was decapitated and mutilated. One year later, about 200 farmers confronted police, destroying a police vehicle in protest over the detention of a person in Santiago Tolman. The incident occurred when two police were arresting a local teacher. The residents detained the police for three hours, suspecting that they were kidnapping the teacher, and threatened to lynch the officers. The people were dispersed by an anti-riot squad, but a number of protesters regrouped and blocked the Mexico City-Tulancingo highway, demanding the return of the suspected kidnappers, Later, two police vehicles were torched in protest of the police intervention.

The municipality is also the home of the Topochico prison, containing more than 900 inmates. In 2009, more than twenty prisoners began a revolt in the maximum security area, claiming mistreatment. Two prison workers were taken hostage as the riot spread to other parts of the facilities. Control of the prison by authorities was achieved about eight hours later.

== The town ==
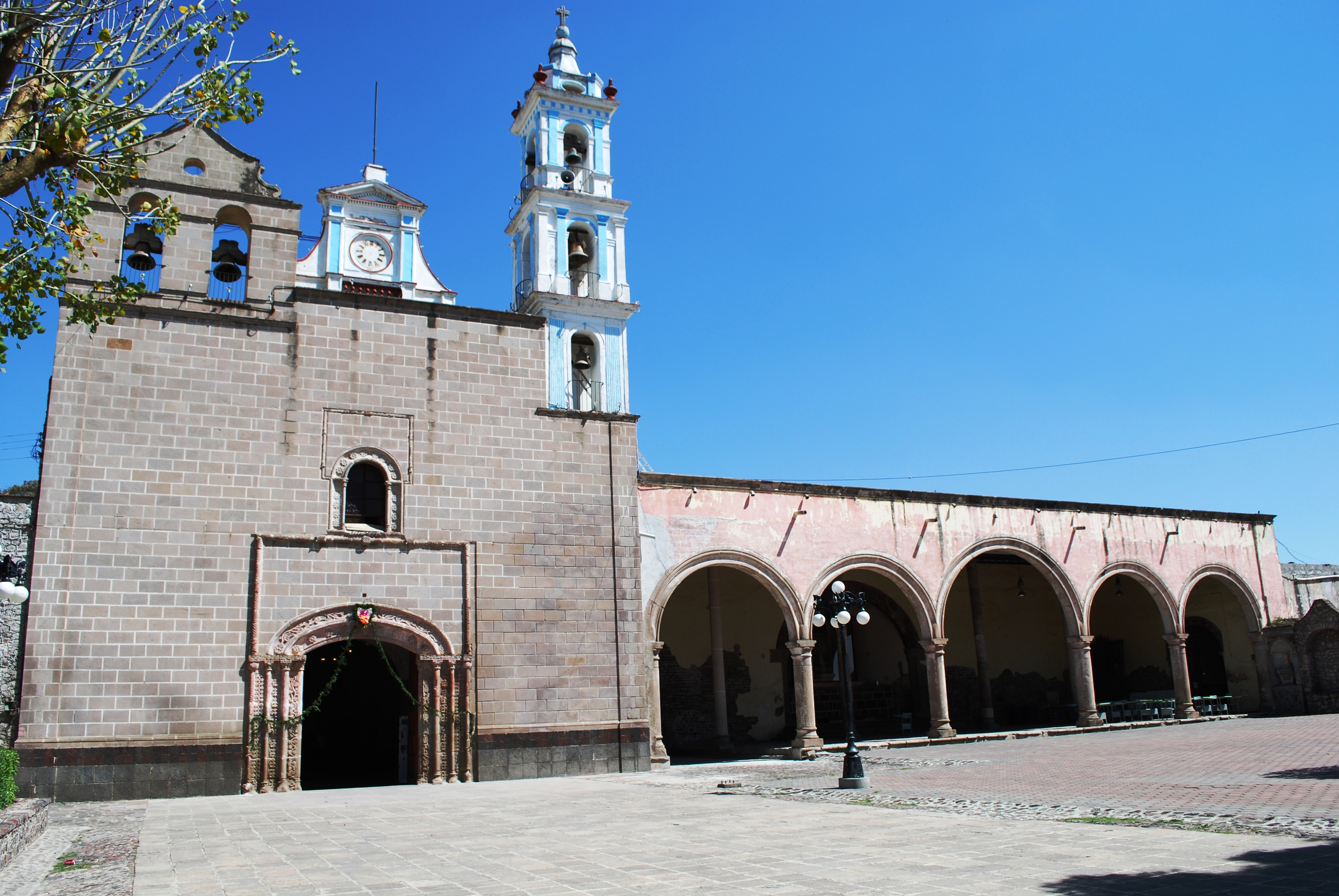
Parish of the Purísima Concepción

For several years, the government has worked on restoration and beautification projects with the aim of being included as one of the Pueblos con Encanto del Bicentenario (Bicentennial Towns with Charm). The program was initiated in 2008, with Otumba as one of the eighteen towns selected. The hope is also that the improvements and designation will attract tourists. Like most towns in Mexico, the center of Otumba is a main plaza surrounded the most important buildings of the community. The main plaza is decorated with leafy trees and a kiosk, which has a small café inside, surrounded by the Parish of the Purisima Concepción with its cloister from the 16th century, the municipal palace and the Gonzalo Carrasco Museum.

The Parish of the Purísima Concepción began as the Franciscan monastery, probably built in the 1530s. The parish was established in 1603 with important aspects of the parish church dating to the 18th century. It was one of the most important and visited constructions in the early colonial period. The church is constructed over a pre-Hispanic platform. On its saints day, the town of Otumba lays out a carpet of flower petals on the atrium of the church along with decorative floral portals, dances, barbacoa and mole. A stone monument from the colonial era called La Picota is situated in the atrium of the parish church. It was broken after the Mexican War of Independence, reducing its height from four meters to two. Beside this monument is where new viceroys received their power symbolically from the outgoing viceroy. The vandalism of the column is thought to be a popular repudiation of the colonial system. The portal is in Plateresque and has an arch framed by thin columns on which wind sculpted vines and flowers. The door is surrounded by an alfiz, a design that is repeated in the choir area. The interior is covered by a barrel vault, which probably dates from the 18th century. The facade of the cloister contains an open chapel with the interior of simple design and murals.

The municipal palace is a sober Neo-colonial construction. The facade has two levels of arches with windows and ironwork balconies on the other sides. These details and the balustrade make the building appear older, but it was constructed in the 20th century. It was built this way to respect the colonial look of its predecessor.

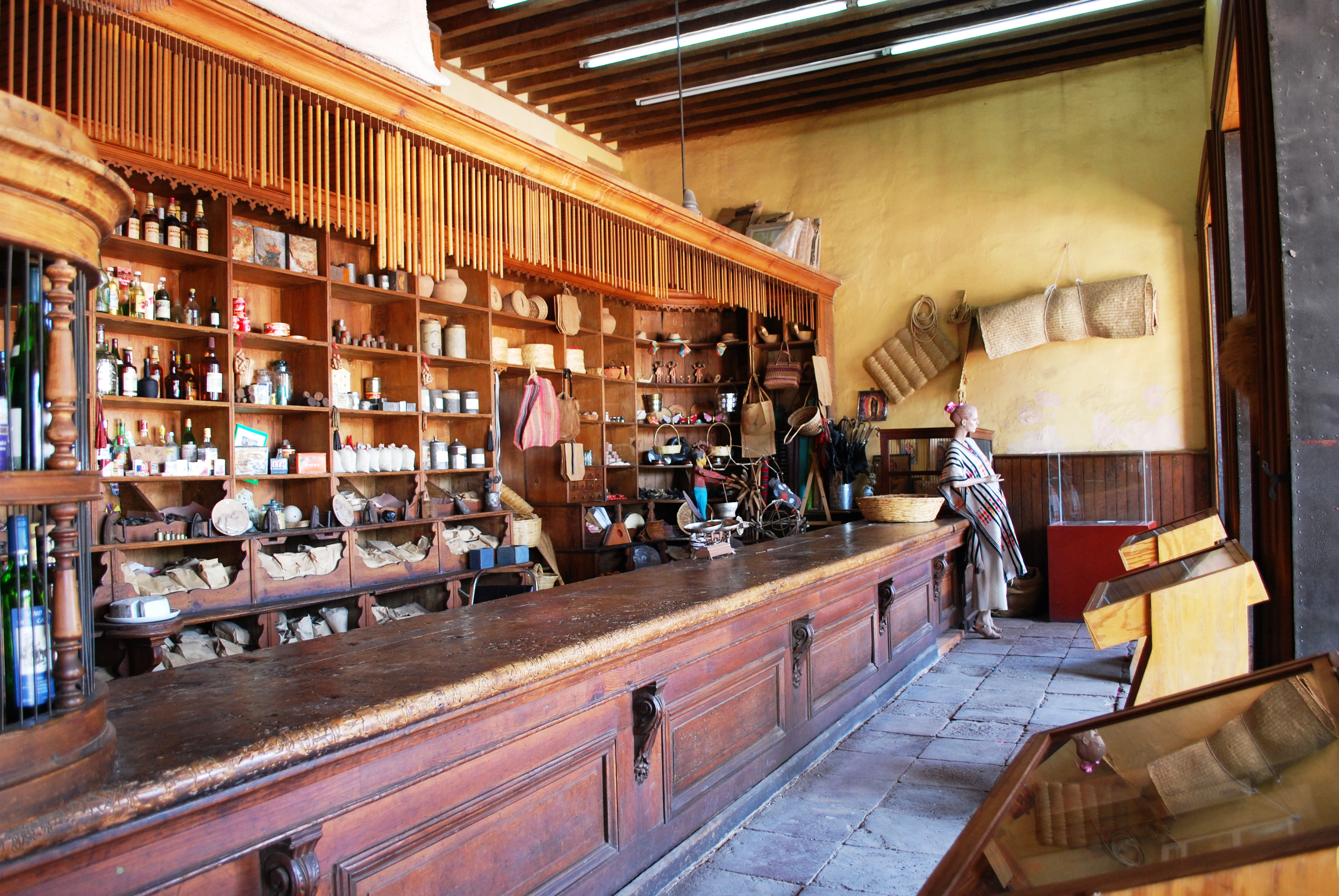
Recreation of general store in the Carrasco Museum

The Gonzalo Carrasco Museum and Cultural Center is located in the house in which the painter was born, which is on one side of the main plaza on Plaza de la Constitucion 17. It has been designated as an architectural monument. The house traditionally was called the Portal El Fénix, home of the Carrasco family, who were merchants. Gonzalo Carrasco was a Jesuit, theologian and painter who was active in the late 19th century and early 20th. He studied at the Academy of San Carlos and with José María Velasco and his work adorns a number of buildings in Mexico and other countries. Portal El Fénix is a two-story structure with a central courtyard. The lower floor was dedicated to businesses such as a general store, hairdressers and wine shop, with the family's residence upstairs. A number of rooms have been restored to what they were like in the late 19th and early 20th centuries. However, the most representative part of the building was called the Tienda Grande (Large Store), a term which came to be used to refer to the entire structure. It was located in the front under the balconies. Here were sold basic necessities such as bread, fabric, wax, grains and more. This house burned in 1876, but was rebuilt.

Local residents initiated the restoration of the building in the latter 20th century, which was opened in 1981 as the Casa de Cultura y Museo Gonzalo Carrasco. It contains eleven halls. Five halls are dedicated to pre-Hispanic pieces from the Aztec, Teotihuacan and Otomi cultures. There are also photographs of codices, of civil and religious constructions, of the construction of the Otumba rail line, and haciendas and of the pulque they made. A number of rooms such as the dining room, bedrooms, kitchen and living room which are left as the family lived in them, with some of the original furniture. One room is dedicated to Carrasco's work.

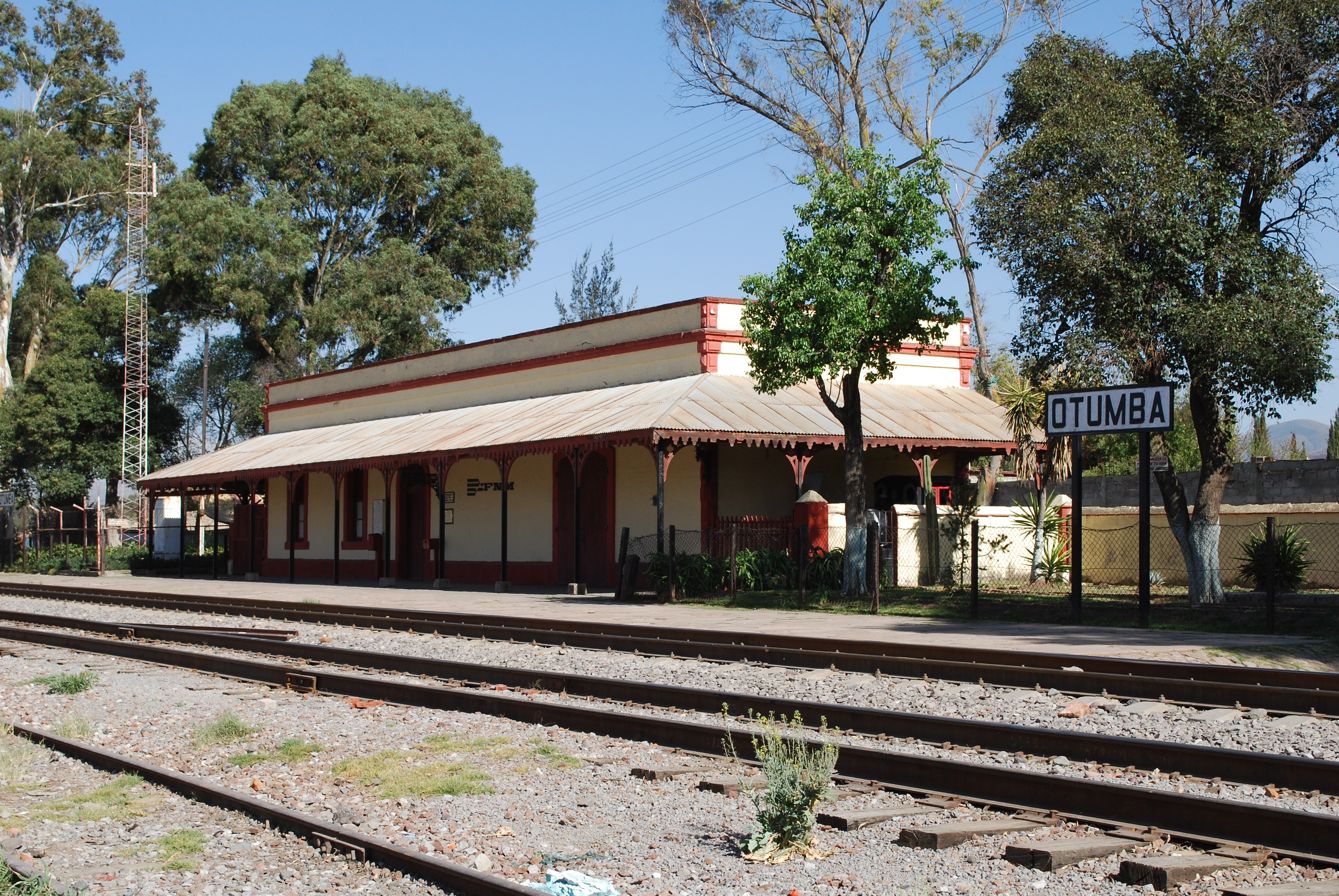
Railroad Museum

Outside of the main plaza area, but just as important, is the railroad station. Its establishment made Otumba a key communication interchange as well as important point of transfer for the shipment of pulque to Mexico City. The first rail concession through the Otumba area was granted in 1837, although it was cancelled later. In small sections a rail line was built through here and put into service in 1873, transporting passengers and cargo to and from Mexico City to points east and south. The current station was built in 1906 as part of the Mexico City-Veracruz line of the old Ferrocarril Mexicano. The station was abandoned shortly after 1995, when the railroad system was privatized. Today, the station serves as a museum for the municipality, the Museo del Ferrocarril en Otumba. It contains exhibits such as a copy of the first train ticket issued in Mexico along with the reconditioned telegraph office and an archive of photographs from the late 19th and early 20th century.

In the municipal market one can find tlacoyos, quesadillas made with squash flowers, mushrooms, barbacoa, mixiote, mole and pulque. In season, a number of other unusual dishes are served such as maguey larvae, chinicuiles, escamoles and snails.

== Feria del Burro and the Burroland donkey shelter ==
Otumba was a major center for the sale and trading of donkeys during the colonial period because it was at the crossroads of the highways into Mexico City, where many donkeys passed by carrying merchandise and riders. Donkeys were used well into the 20th century due to the poor conditions of many roads in Mexico and the inability of trucks to enter farms and haciendas producing pulque, milk and cactus fruit. Even though the municipality is transitioning to a suburb of Mexico City, the donkey is still considered a valuable part of the culture and in some places is still used for work.

The Feria del Burro (Donkey Fair) was first held in 1965, and is the oldest annual fair in existence in the State of Mexico. The fair was begun as an adjunct to the celebration of the Señor de Animas, which has since been forgotten. The principal attraction, the donkeys, are presented in a number of ways. There is polo played on donkeys, costume contests where the animals are dressed as famous people, a donkey race around the main plaza, and a large parade with floats. In addition, there are traditional festival attractions such as sports events, local food, fireworks, and folk dance. There a crafts expo with more than 85 producers with 17 different types of crafts, with a Crafts Contest. Money earned from the event has gone to improving the appearance of the town, such as a burying electric and telephone cables. The annual event has drawn as many as 50,000 visitors.

Burrolandia, or the Donkey Sanctuary of Mexico, is an animal shelter that specializes in donkeys and contains about twenty animals. Burrolandia was begun by the Flores family on land next to the family's home in 2006. It is not scenic, as donkeys wander around rusting 1940s era cars. Visitors are given donkey ears and tails to wear as they visit a small museum, along with papier-mâché burros. There are puppet shows and burro rides. Burroland is sustained by donations from visitors, local companies and international groups like Donkey Sanctuary in Britain. Despite the animals’ historical importance in Mexico, pick up trucks and tractors are preferred by farmers even in the poorest areas. While the animals may still have their place culturally, the lack of work has made them more of a burden than an asset. The donkey population plummeted from one million in 1991 to about 581,000 in 2007 as many were killed by their owners or sold to slaughterhouses. Another reason farmers get rid of the animals is that they are associated with backwardness, and now the animals are not even worth 500 pesos anymore. This has spawned the Otumba effort to create the sanctuary as well as other projects such as free veterinary care for those animals still on farms.

== The municipality ==
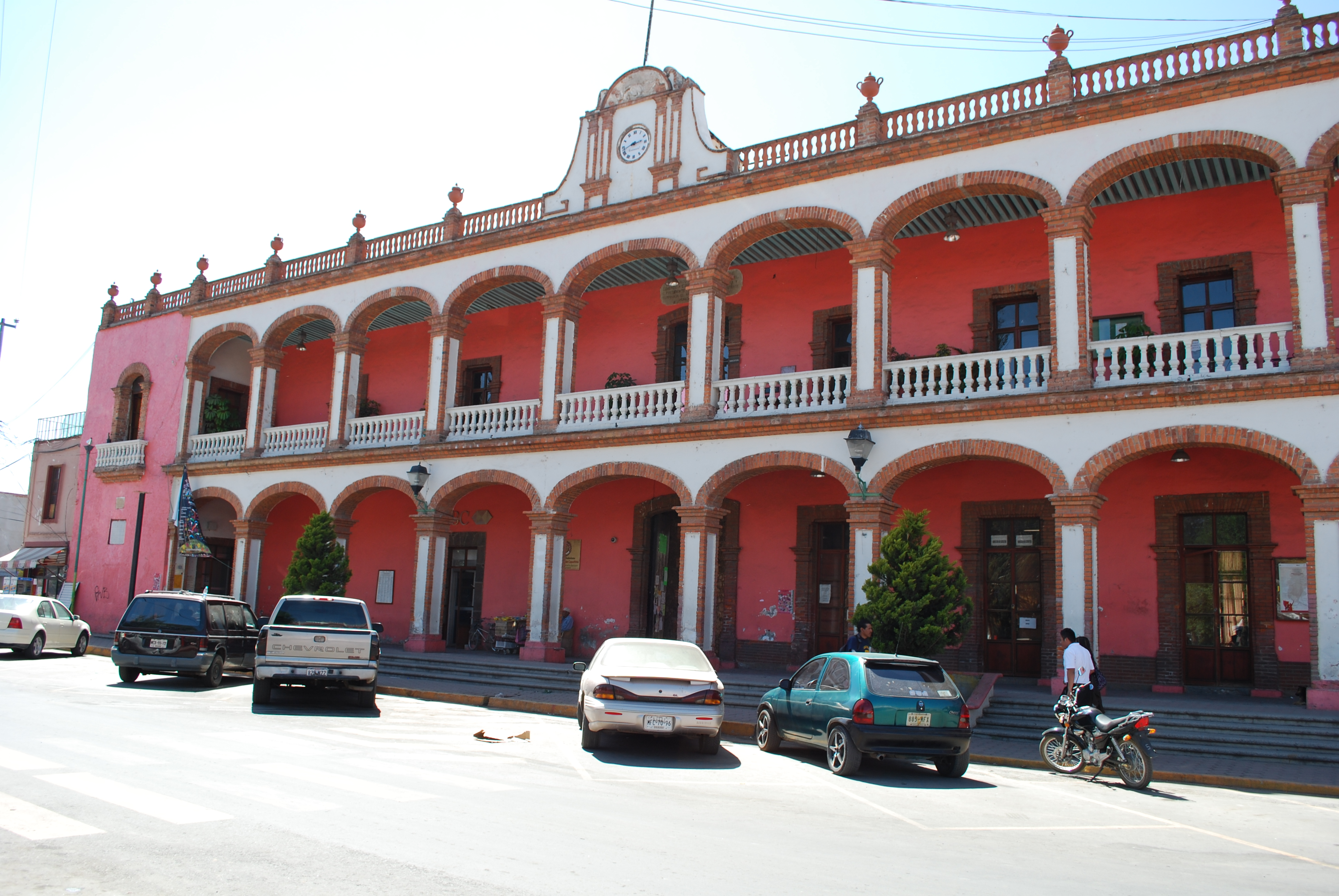
Municipal palace

As municipal seat, the town of Otumba is the local governing authority for over eighty other communities, covering a territory of 143.42 km2. The population of the municipality is 29,873 with less than a third living in the town proper. The municipality borders the municipalities of Axapusco, Tepetlaoxtoc, San Martín de las Pirámides and the states of Tlaxcala and Hidalgo to the southeast and east.

Geographically about fifteen percent of the territory is rugged terrain, forty percent is rolling hills and forty five percent is flat. Elevation varies between 2300 and 2900 meters above sea level and includes the Las Bateas, San Pedro, La Charra, Pelón and La Cruz mountains. There are no rivers here but intermittent streams which flow during the rainy season such as El Soldado, Las Bateas, Huixcoloco, Mihuaca and San Vicente. The climate is temperate to moderately cold with a dry climate with maguey and nopal cactus growing wild and less than eight percent of the land forested. High temperatures can reach 31C in the summer and -2.3C in the winter. Wild vegetation and wildlife is mostly restricted to the highest elevations and include pines, willows, mimosas, jacarandas, squirrels, armadillos, opossums, coyotes, and various reptiles and insects.

About 59% of the municipality's land is used for agriculture, which depends on both seasonal rains and irrigation. Major crops are cactus fruit and nopal Livestock raised here includes domestic fowl, horses, sheep, goats, pigs and cattle. Industry consists on only small scale operations that produce locally needed products such as processed foods, textiles, furniture and bricks. Likewise, most commerce is of a local nature. Crafts are practiced on a minor scale working with fine woods, obsidian, and onyx.

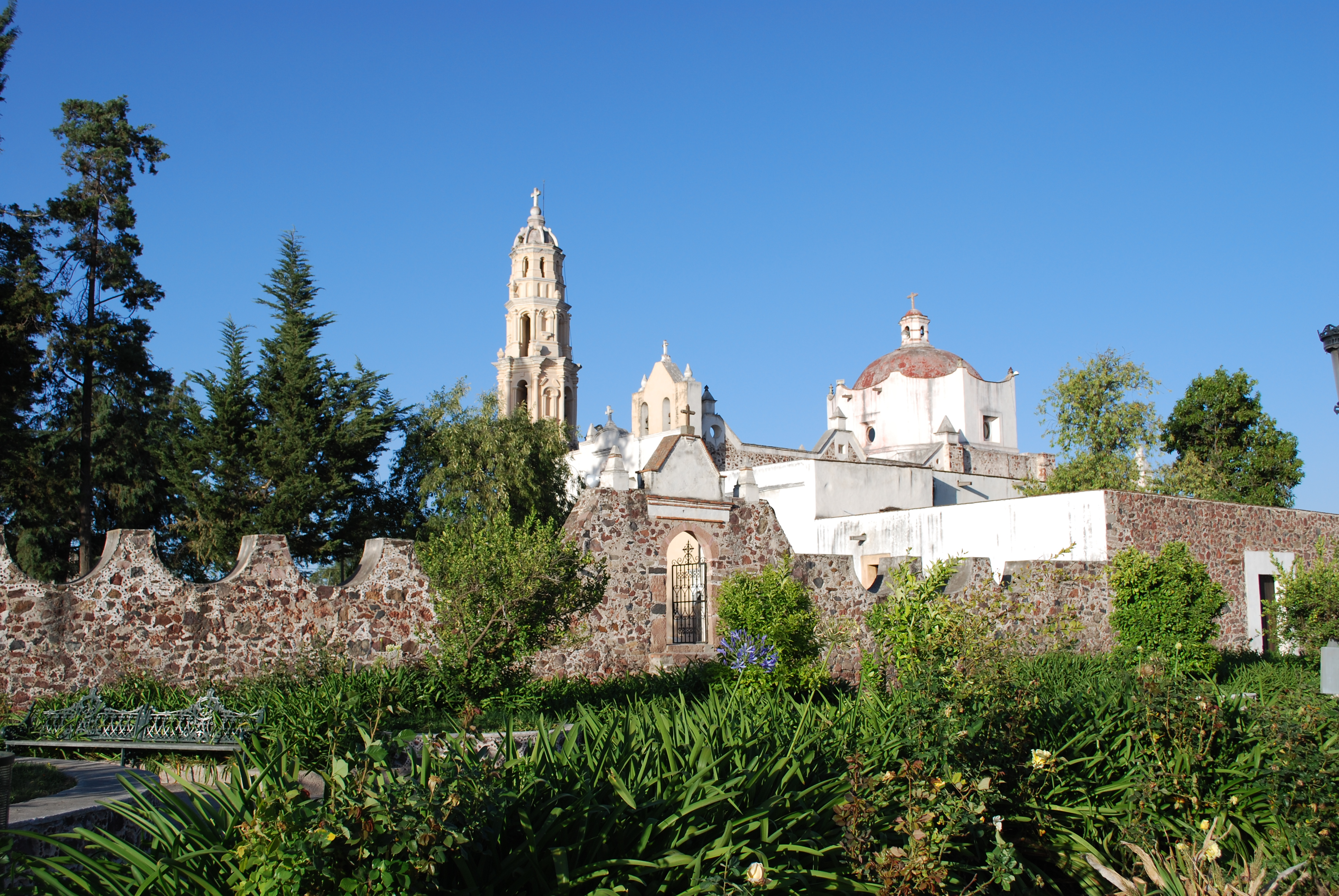
Church and ex monastery of Oxtotipac

The municipality contains a number of tourist attractions but these not fully are not taken advantage of. One of these is the ex monastery of Oxtotipac, which was established by the Franciscans over what was a teocalli, or Aztec sacred precinct. The complex is in Plateresque style and consecrated to San Nicolas de Bari. The facade looks a bit like a reliquary with its two rose windows, with a portería, or main entryway, consists of five arches with finely carved columns. This facade dates from 1675, and breaks with the usual austerity of Franciscan monasteries decorated with vegetable motifs. The interior columns are delicately worked in stone and contain interlinked Renaissance and Romance style ornamentation as well as Otomi elements. The monastery contains two baptismal fonts, one of which is from the 16th century. It recently underwent a four-year restoration projects costing approximately 700,000 pesos. Work on this monastery was sponsored by a civil association called Adopte una Obra de Arte (Adopt a Work of Art) along with the State of Mexico. One of the major causes of damage to the monastery was the theft of its religious art, so security measures were installed. Indoor and outdoor walls were repaired and three altarpieces were cleaned and restored, along with a number of other sculptures and paintings. The cloister area holds a collection of art works original to the monastery.

In some of the smaller communities of the municipality, such as Huayapan, San Antonio, San Miguel and Soapayuca, about 80% of the constructions are non-modern, many of which have had their facades renovated. A number of old haciendas in the municipality have been renovated and adapted to new uses. Haciendas in this area turned to pulque production after the cattle had overgrazed the pastures. The San Antonio Xala Haciendas was a pulque hacienda from the 19th century which now is a hotel and restaurant. The elegant rooms and main chapel are open for visits. The San Antonio Xala Hacienda has been reconditioned as a rustic vacation center with cabins, horse facilities, a pool, event hall and a car from one of the first trains to go through the region. It also has a restaurant that specialized in local cuisine including breads and cheeses made on the premises. The Soapayuca Hacienda today houses offices of the Adidas Corporation. The courtyard contains a majestic fountain and its chapel with an image of Christ in the entrance is unique. The former Santa María de Guadalupe Tepa Hacienda has a ceremonial mound with 40 meters in diameter and other constructions that date from the Teotihuacan period. In the mid 2000s, the state government granted permission to the municipality to use the land to build ball fields and a municipal cemetery, but this work was halted by INAH in order to preserve the pre-Hispanic ruins.

The San Antonio Ometuxco Hacienda is located about fifteen km outside the town of Otumba. The main house, according to some of the oldest residents here, shined in the sun which reflected off of its fine ceramic tiles. Today, Roman style statues, remains of Talavera tile and leafy trees still remain. The hacienda belonged to Ignacio Torres Adalid, who was the director of taxation during the regime of Porfirio Díaz. After that, it belonged to a foreigner, and after that it belonged to a group of ten farmers, who decided to sell it in 1910. It was sold to another foreigner in 1978, who still owns it but has abandoned it. The rooms of the house has old furniture and other things, but the most valuable possessions are the house's murals, paintings, fountains and gardens, along with religious figures in the chapel. This also used to be a pulque-producing hacienda and the tinacal, or production area, still remains, made of wood with thick beams. There are murals here as well, about the history of pulque.

The small community of Apaxco claims to have one of the most beautiful churches of the region named the Temple of San Esteban Axapusco. It has been restored, with new paint and gold leaf. The main altarpieces traces the genealogy of Jesus and the walls contain murals about the Twelve Apostles which date from the 17th century. Other attractions include caves which were occupied by the Chichimecas in Oztotipac and water parks/spas such as Los Pajaritos and El Temascal.
