= Juan Velázquez de León =

Spanish explorer

Juan Velázquez de León was a Spanish conquistador who, along with Hernán Cortés, participated in the third Spanish expedition to continental America (present-day Mexico) in 1519. He was distinguished by being relative of the then Governor of Cuba Diego Velázquez, but overall served Hernán Cortés and the cause of the Conquest. Cortés gave Juan the daughter of Maxixcatzin, baptized as Doña Elvira, after the Tlaxcallan's made peace with the Spanish.

Juan had a determining participation in the defeat of the army of Pánfilo de Narváez, when Cortés sent him to "win him friends in Narváez' camp."

He died when the Aztec army attacked the Spaniards as they fled the city of Tenochtitlán, during the La Noche Triste.
