= Massacre in the Great Temple of Tenochtitlan =

1520 killing of unarmed Aztec elites by Spaniards during the conquest of the Aztec Empire

Coordinates: 19.435°N 99.1314°W

- Part of Spanish conquest of the Mexica
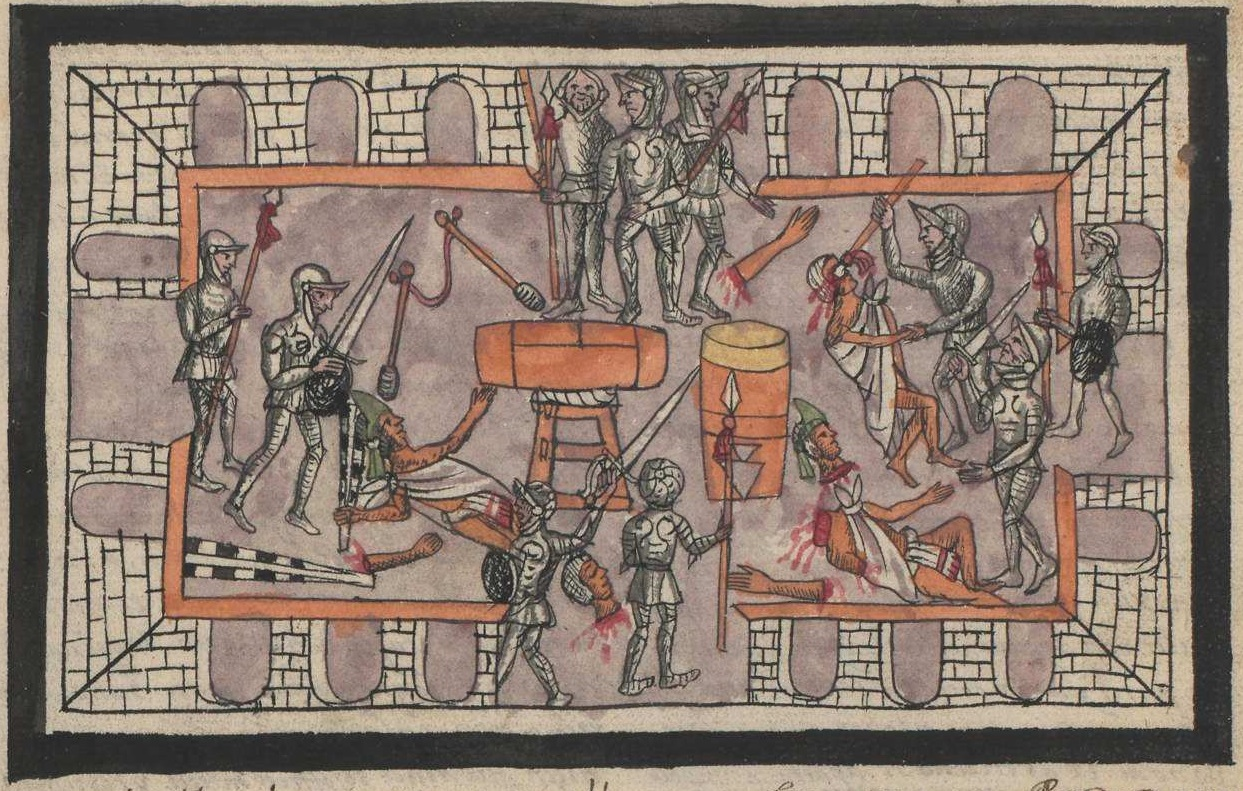
- Painting depicting the Massacre in the Great Temple
- Location: Tenochtitlan
- Date: 22 May 1520
- Attack type: Mass murder
- Deaths: Around a few thousand deaths
- Perpetrator: Spanish Empire

The Massacre in the Great Temple, also called the Toxcatl Massacre, or the Alvarado Massacre, was an event on 22 May 1520, in the Mexica, also known as the Aztec, capital of Tenochtitlan during the Spanish conquest of the Aztec Empire, in which the celebration of the Feast of Toxcatl ended in a massacre of Mexica elites.

In late April of 1520, Cuban Governor Diego Velázquez de Cuéllar ordered Spanish conquistador, Pánfilo de Narváez, to arrest Hernán Cortés while he was in Tenochtitlan. Cortés heard about Narváez coming from Cuba, so he and some of his army left the city of Tenochtitlan to fight them. Before he departed, he entrusted one of his captains, Pedro de Alvarado, with governing both the Spanish and Mexica. During his absence, the Mexica emperor Moctezuma, also known as Montezuma, asked Alvarado for permission to celebrate the festival of Toxcatl, a Mexica festivity in honor of Tezcatlipoca, one of their main gods. Moctezuma had previously gotten authorization to celebrate the festival of Toxcatl from Cortés. However, Alvarado suspected that the Mexica were using Toxcatl as cover for a rebellion against the Spaniards. After the festivities had started, Alvarado turned on the Mexica, killing performers, spectators, and nobles celebrating inside Tenochtitlan's Great Temple. According to Mexica accounts, the Spanish blocked all exits and charged ferociously at the celebrants, killing indiscriminately.

Spanish accounts of the massacre suggest several possible incitements, some saying the Mexica wanted to reclaim the gold the Spaniards had taken, and others blaming Narváez for causing Cortés' abrupt departure. The Mexica also say the Spaniards openly coveted the gold the Mexica were wearing, prompting a Mexica rebellion against the orders of Moctezuma. Although Alvarado's motive was debated, all accounts agree that the Mexica at the feast were mostly unarmed and the massacre was not directly provoked, and occurred with no warning.

There were already tensions between the Mexica and the occupying Spaniards, who were holding Moctezuma prisoner. When Cortés and his men returned, the Mexica drove the Spaniards out of the city on the so-called the Sad Night (La Noche Triste), losing most of their men in battle or as prisoners who were then sacrificed.

== A Mexica account of the incident ==
This is part of the Mexica account:

Here it is told how the Spaniards killed, they murdered the Aztecs who were celebrating the Fiesta of Huitzilopochtli in the place they called The Patio of the Gods

At this time, when everyone was enjoying the celebration, when everyone was already dancing, when everyone was already singing, when song was linked to song and the songs roared like waves, in that precise moment the Spaniards determined to kill people. They came into the patio, armed for battle.

They came to close the exits, the steps, the entrances [to the patio]: The Gate of the Eagle in the smallest palace, The Gate of the Canestalk and the Gate of the Snake of Mirrors. And when they had closed them, no one could get out anywhere.

Once they had done this, they entered the Sacred Patio to kill people. They came on foot, carrying swords and wooden and metal shields. Immediately, they surrounded those who danced, then rushed to the place where the drums were played. They attacked the man who was drumming and cut off both his arms. Then they cut off his head [with such a force] that it flew off, falling far away.

At that moment, they then attacked all the people, stabbing them, spearing them, wounding them with their swords. They struck some from behind, who fell instantly to the ground with their entrails hanging out [of their bodies]. They cut off the heads of some and smashed the heads of others into little pieces.

They struck others in the shoulders and tore their arms from their bodies. They struck some in the thighs and some in the calves. They slashed others in the abdomen and their entrails fell to the earth. There were some who even ran in vain, but their bowels spilled as they ran; they seemed to get their feet entangled with their own entrails. Eager to flee, they found nowhere to go.

Some tried to escape, but the Spaniards murdered them at the gates while they laughed. Others climbed the walls, but they could not save themselves. Others entered the communal house, where they were safe for a while. Others lay down among the victims and pretended to be dead. But if they stood up again they [the Spaniards] would see them and kill them.

The blood of the warriors ran like water as they ran, forming pools, which widened, as the smell of blood and entrails fouled the air.

And the Spaniards walked everywhere, searching the communal houses to kill those who were hiding. They ran everywhere, they searched every place.

When [people] outside [the Sacred Patio learned of the massacre], shouting began, "Captains, Mexicas, come here quickly! Come here with all arms, spears, and shields! Our captains have been murdered! Our warriors have been slain! Oh Mexica captains, [our warriors] have been annihilated!"

Then a roar was heard, screams, people wailed, as they beat their palms against their lips. Quickly the captains assembled, as if planned in advance, and carried their spears and shields. Then the battle began. [The Mexicas] attacked them with arrows and even javelins, including small javelins used for hunting birds. They furiously hurled their javelins [at the Spaniards]. It was as if a layer of yellow canes spread over the Spaniards. – Visión de los Vencidos

== The Spaniards' account of the incident ==
Spanish Historian Francisco López de Gómara's account:

Cortes wanted to entirely understand the cause of the Indians' rebellion. He interrogated them [the Spaniards] altogether. Some said it was caused by the message sent by Narváez, others because the people wanted to toss the Spaniards out of the Aztec city [Tenochtitlan], which had been planned as soon as the ships had arrived, because while they were fighting they shouted "Get out!" at them. Others said it was to liberate Moctezuma, for they fought saying, "Free our god and King if you don't want to die!" Still others said it was to steal the gold, silver, and jewels that the Spaniards had, because they heard the Indians say, "Here you shall leave the gold that you have taken!" Again, some said it was to keep the Tlaxcalans and other mortal enemies out of the Aztec lands. Finally, many believed that taking their idols as gods, they had given themselves to the devil.

Any of these things would have been enough to cause the rebellion, not to mention all of them together. But the principal one was that a few days after Cortes left to confront Narváez, it became time for a festival the Mexicas wanted to celebrate in their traditional way. . . . They begged Pedro de Alvarado to give them his permission, so [the Spaniards] wouldn't think that they planned to kill them. Alvarado consented provided that there were no sacrifices, no people killed, and no one had weapons.

More than 600 gentlemen and several lords gathered in the yard of the largest temple; some said there were more than a thousand there. They made a lot of noise with their drums, shells, bugles, and hendidos, which sounded like a loud whistle. Preparing their festival, they were naked, but covered with precious stones, pearls, necklaces, belts, bracelets, many jewels of gold, silver, and mother-of-pearl, wearing very rich feathers on their heads. They performed a dance called the mazeualiztli, which is called that because it is a holiday from work [symbolized by the word for farmer, macehaulli]. . . . They laid mats in the patio of the temple and played drums on them. They danced in circles, holding hands, to the music of the singers, to which they responded.

The songs were sacred, and not profane, and were sung to praise the god honored in the festival, to induce him to provide water and grain, health, and victory, or to thank him for healthy children and other things. And those who knew the language and these ceremonial rites said that when the people danced in the temples, they perform very different from those who danced the netoteliztli, in voice, movement of the body, head, arms, and feet, by which they manifested their concepts of good and evil. The Spaniards called this dance, an areito, a word they brought from the islands of Cuba and Santo Domingo.

While the Mexica gentlemen were dancing in the temple yard of Vitcilopuchtli [Huitzilopochtli], Pedro de Alvarado went there. Whether on [the basis of] his own opinion or in an agreement decided by everyone, I don't know, but some say he had been warned that the Indian nobles of the city had assembled to plot the mutiny and the rebellion, which they later carried out; others, believe that [the Spaniards] went to watch them perform this famous and praised dance, and seeing how rich they were and wanting the gold the Indians were wearing, he [Alvarado] covered each of the entrances with ten or twelve Spaniards and went inside with more than fifty [Spaniards], and without remorse and lacking any Christian piety, they brutally stabbed and killed the Indians, and took what they were wearing.

== Aftermath ==
Cortés returned to the city, after hearing of the massacre, in late June of 1520. Cortés ordered Moctezuma to try and plead for peace among the Mexica, wanting their rebellious nature towards the Spanish to stop so they could safely depart the city. Shortly after, Moctezuma was murdered, although historians are unsure if he was strangled by the Spanish out of fear of inciting a larger revolt, or if he was stoned by his own people due to him not supporting their rebellion. Immediately following the murder of Moctezuma, his brother, Cuitláhuac, was made Emperor of the Mexica and he, unlike his brother, supported the revolt against the Spaniards. Cortés, his army, and the Spaniards resorted to an attempt to stealthily sneak out of Tenochtitlan during the night of a rainstorm. However, this strategy backfired as the Mexica caught wind of Cortés' attempt, and spotted them attempting to flee. Cuitláhuac led the Mexica as they chased down Cortés and his army, which resulted in over 800 Spanish and 2000 Tlaxcalan deaths, many of whom drowned in Lake Texcoco because they were carrying gold that was stolen from the Mexica. This event became known as La Noche Triste, or in English The Night of Sorrows or The Sad Night, which was a major event that led to the Mexica surrendering their empire in 1521, ending their reign.

== Primary sources ==
- Cortés, Hernán (2001) [1971]. Letters from Mexico. Translated by Pagden, Anthony (rev. ed.). New Haven; London: Yale University Press. ISBN 9780300090949. OCLC 173817554.
- Lopez de Gómara, Francisco (2008) [1553]. Historia general de las Indias [General history of the Indies]. Barcelona: Linkgua Ediciones. ISBN 9788498168990. OCLC 520793730. See also Historia general de las Indias.
- "War Breaks Out Between Spaniards and Mexicas / López de Gómara on Mexica Rebellion". theaha.org. Archived from the original on 2004-12-15. Excerpts of the Florentine Codex, compiled by Fr Bernardino de Sahagún and translated by Nancy Fitch.
- "Teaching and Learning: Conquest of Mexico: Guide to Digitized Sources". historians.org. Archived from the original on 2009-11-08.
