= Relación breve de la conquista de la Nueva España =

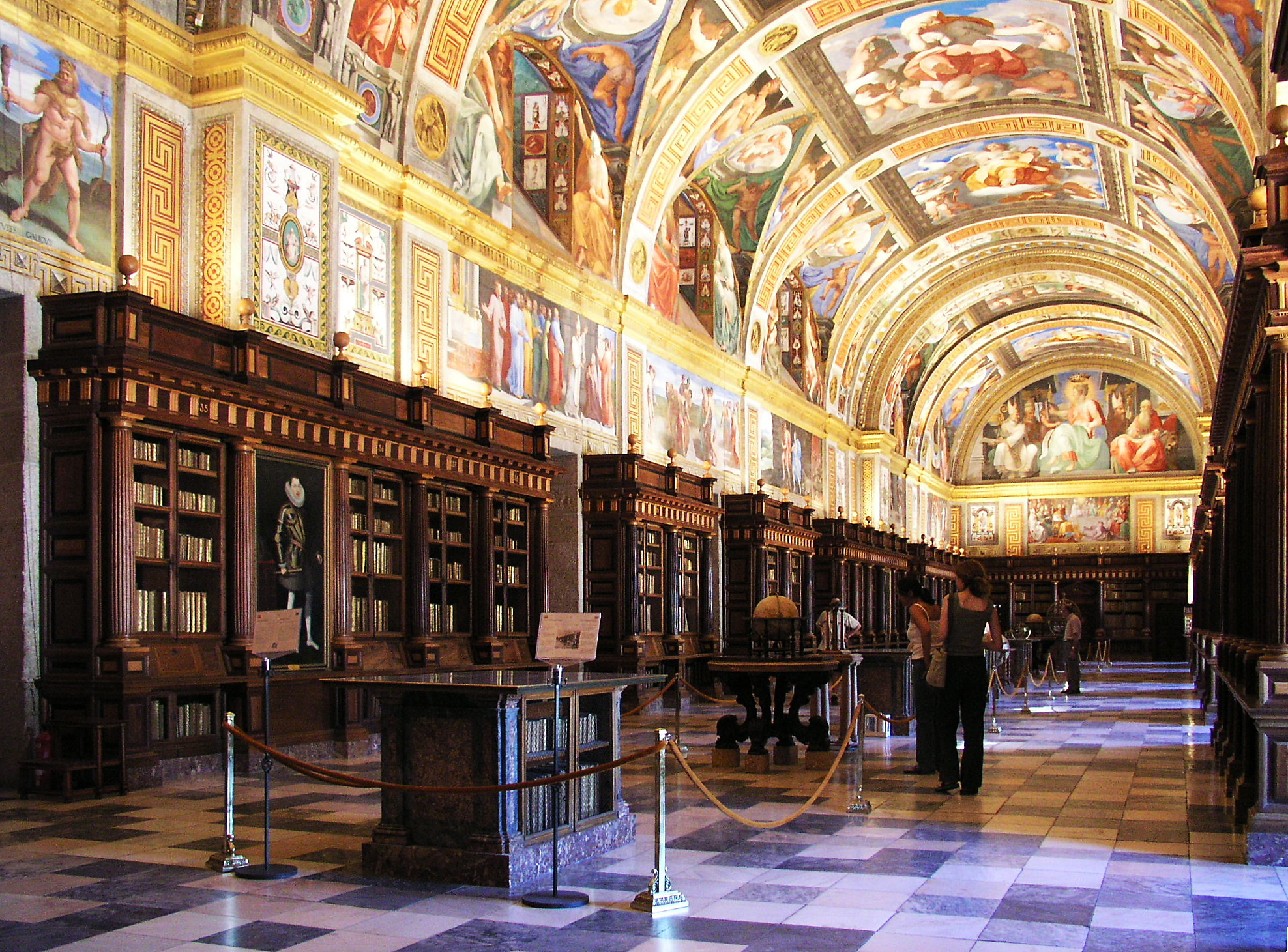
Interior of the library of el Escorial, where the manuscript of Relación breve de la conquista de la Nueva España is kept

Relación breve de la conquista de la Nueva España (English: Short Account of the Conquest of New Spain) is the account of friar Francisco de Aguilar, who in his youth took part in the Spanish conquest of the Aztec Empire as a conquistador under the command of Hernán Cortés.

According to the introduction by the author, the account was written after Aguilar had joined the Dominican Order, at a time in which he would have been more than 80 years old, between 1559 and 1571. Following the death of Francisco de Aguilar, the manuscript came into the possession of the Viceroyalty of New Spain and the Roman Catholic Archdiocese of Mexico Pedro Moya de Contreras, who then gave it to Philip II of Spain. Since then, the Relación breve de la conquista de la Nueva España has been held along with other 16th century manuscripts in the library of the Royal Site of San Lorenzo de El Escorial. The manuscript survived a fire in the library that occurred on 7 June 1671.

The Relación is a memoiristic text that constitutes one of the earliest and most significant testimonies of the conquest of Mexico, alongside the Historia verdadera de la conquista de la Nueva España by Bernal Díaz del Castillo.. Compared with other contemporary chronicles, Aguilar’s text is valued for its clarity and for the moral perspective developed after his entry into the Order of Preachers. It also served as a reference for later chroniclers such as friar Diego Durán in his Historia de las Indias de Nueva España.

== Description ==
The work was written by Aguilar in old age, when he was over eighty years old, at the request of his Dominican brethren, who invited him to leave a record of his experience. According to the author himself, his aim was to write “a brief account, without circumlocutions or digressions”.

The text is divided into a prologue and eight sections, called jornadas, arranged in chronological order: from the expedition of Juan de Grijalva (1518) to the fall of Tenochtitlán and the consolidation of Spanish rule. Aguilar describes central episodes such as the clashes with the Tlaxcalans, the Cholula massacre, the imprisonment and death of Moctezuma II, the Noche Triste, and the Battle of Otumba. The style is sober, concise, and devoid of rhetorical ornament. Although not a systematic “history”, the Relación has historiographical value for the immediacy of a firsthand witness, who alternates the collective “we” with the personal “I” in certain passages.

== Publication history ==
The original manuscript is preserved in the Royal Library of the Monastery of El Escorial. It was sent to Spain in 1579 by Bishop Pedro Moya de Contreras. In the 19th century, the Relación was rediscovered by scholars such as José Fernando Ramírez and Francisco del Paso y Troncoso, and saw its first printed edition in 1900. Since then it has had several modern editions; one of the most complete is that edited by Jorge Gurría Lacroix for the UNAM in 1977, which offers a paleographic transcription and an extensive critical apparatus.

In 1892, the Mexican historian Francisco del Paso y Troncoso, managed to obtain a copy of “Relación breve de la conquista de la Nueva España”. This same copy was then used by fellow Mexican historian Luis González Obregón, who included it in his Anales del Museo Nacional de México, t. VIII (1ª. época ), entrega 1ª., under the title Historia de la Nueva España (English: History of New Spain), in June 1900.

The text was modernized by Alfonso Teja Zabre, and released under the title Historia de la Nueva España, in November 1937. The editor refers to Francisco de Aguilar as Alonso de Aguilar; because according to Mexican historian José Luis Martínez, Aguilar changed his name when he joined the Dominican Order. This edition was republished in 1938 by the publisher Botas. In 1943, the publisher Vargas Rea again republished the work, this time under the title Relato breve de la conquista de la Nueva España .

In 1954 Federico Gómez de Orozco headed the publication of a new edition featuring an essay by Father Mariano Gutiérrez and a biography of the author written by Agustín Dávila Padilla. The edition was published under the title Relación breve de la conquista de la Nueva España, escrita por fray Francisco de Aguilar, de la orden de predicadores (English: Short History of Conquest of New Spain, Written by Friar Francisco de Aguilar, of the Order of Preachers) by the publisher José Porrúa e hijos.

In 1963, the edition by Gómez de Orozco was translated into English and published by Orion Press under the title The Chronicle of Fray Francisco de Aguilar, with a preface by Howard D. Cline.

In 1977, Jorge Gurría Lacroix included a facsimile of the original manuscript, the introductions of past editions, and a preliminary academic study, under the name Relación breve de la conquista de la Nueva España, in the collection Serie de historiadores y cronistas de Indias no.7, National Autonomous University of Mexico.

In 2002, Germán Vázquez Chamorro, released a compilation entitled Conquista de Tenochtitlan (English: The Conquest of Tenochtitlan), which includes “Relación breve de la conquista de la Nueva España”.

== See also ==
- Historia verdadera de la conquista de la Nueva España
- Historia general de las Indias

== Bibliography ==
- Martínez, José Luis (2005) Hernán Cortés (versión abreviada), Fondo de Cultura Económica, México, ISBN 968-16-4699-1
- Vázquez Chamorro, Germán (2003) La conquista de Tenochtitlan, colección Crónicas de América; compilación de J. Díaz, A. de Tapia, B. Vázquez, F. de Aguilar. “Relación breve de la conquista de la Nueva España” DASTIN S.L. ISBN 84-492-0367-8
