= Chimalpopoca (son of Moctezuma) =

16th century Aztec nobleman

Chimalpopoca was an Aztec nobleman. He is identified by some sources as a son of the Tlatoani Moctezuma II, not be confused with an earlier Aztec ruler of the same name. According to some authors he was taken out of Tenochtitlan as a prisoner with other noble men by the Spaniards during the Noche Triste, when he was killed being struck with a bolt from a crossbow.
