= Isabel Rodríguez =

Doctor and participant in the conquest of Mexico

Isabel Rodríguez, also known as Isabel Rodrigo, was a Spanish nurse, explorer, and doctor of the 16th century. She was the "mother" of 16th century military medicine.

== Biography ==
She was a member of the expedition of Hernán Cortés to Mexico. Born in Spain, her date of birth and of death are unknown. She was known as "The Matron" of the conquest among her companions. Her name is mentioned in the letters of Francisco Cervantes de Salazar and Bernal Díaz del Castillo. Her husband was Miguel Rodríguez de Guadalupe, of whom not much is known. She arrived to the New World prior to 1521 and joined Cortés’ expedition.

Isabel was in charge of the medical part of the expedition. She had the idea of creating an established group of nurses that would accompany the soldiers consistently. She trained and coordinated young women, from both Spain and the allied native nations, that desired to take part in the conquest to treat war wounds and form a corps of nurses that followed the conquerors and intervened after, or even during, battle, to assist the wounded. She might have also served as a woman soldier, as several of her underlings also did.

Some of the women under her command were Beatriz Palacios, Juana Mansilla and Beatriz Muñoz. It is likely that Isabel took over other management duties regarding settlements or food rationing.

Her healing ability was so outstanding that she was said to have a "gift". When the conquest was over, and after several of her companions and former patients acted as witnesses, the Spanish Crown granted her the title of "Honorary Doctor", a profession reserved only for men at the time, and granted her permission to freely exercise medicine in the lands of Nueva España. This makes Isabel one of the first recognized female doctors in western history.

After her intense life of service she settled in Tacubaya, where her service had earned her and her family some terrain, and continued practicing medicine among her local community.
