= Beatriz Bermúdez de Velasco =

Female soldier during the conquest of Mexico

Beatriz Bermúdez de Velasco, also known as La Bermuda, was a Spanish woman soldier during the Spanish conquest of the Aztec Empire.

== Biography ==
She became famous during the expedition of Hernán Cortés to Mexico according to the Spanish chronicler Francisco Cervantes de Salazar. It is unclear if she fought personally at any point, but she became famous for her leadership skills. During the Spanish siege to Tenochtitlan, she harangued the Spanish and allied troops that were on retreat to persuaded them to go back to combat, after which the troops that had run away regrouped and returned to finally defeat the Mexica coalition. She was recognized by her companions and the crown as an instrumental piece in avoiding a second Spanish defeat against the Mexica Empire.

«...and as La Bermuda saw that them both, Spanish and Indian-allies, all in a mess, were retreating, she jumped to the middle of the road and cut their way holding an Indian shield and a Spanish sword, and with a helmet in her head. She told them: "Shame! Shame! Spanish? Embarrassment! Embarrassment! How can you run away from such evil people, who you have defeated so many times before? Go back to help and support your companions, those who are still fighting, as they should. If you don't, and if you try to continue ahead, in the name of God I swear that there won't be a single one of you that isn't killed by my hand; for those who run away from such evil people deserve to die at the hands of a skinny woman as I am".
