= Battle of Otumba =

1520 battle during the Spanish conquest of the Mexica

Coordinates: 19.6969°N 98.7547°W

- Part of the Spanish conquest of the Aztec Empire
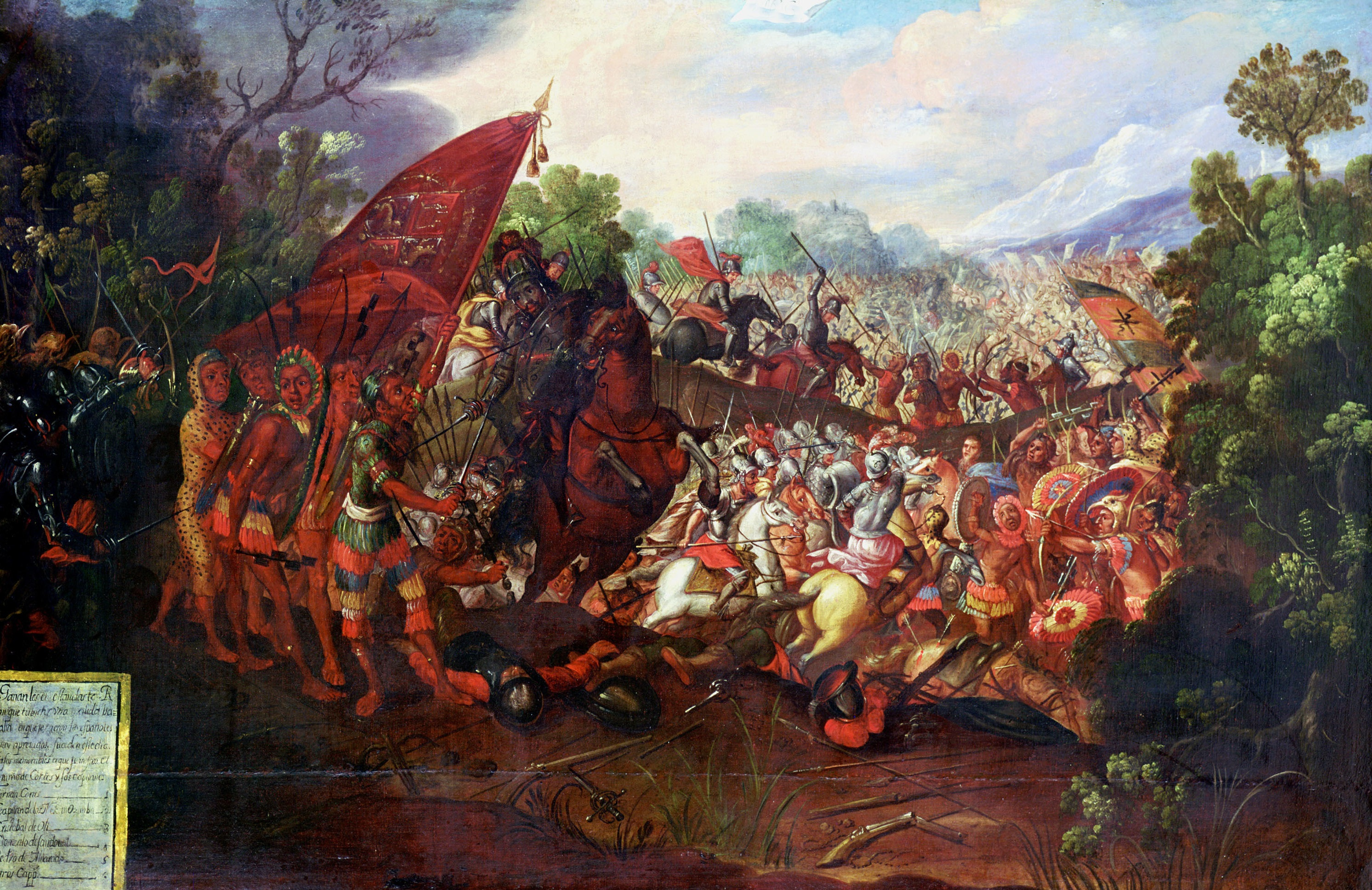
- The Battle of Otumba
Date	7 July 1520 (Julian calendar date)
Location	Otumba, Mexico
Result	Spanish-Tlaxcalan victory

Belligerents
Spanish Empire; Confederacy of Tlaxcala	Aztec Empire

Commanders and leaders
Hernán Cortés	Cihuacoatl Matlatzincatl †

Strength
Spanish Army: 600 soldiers; 13 mounted infantry; 12 crossbowmen; 7 arquebusiers; No artillery; Tlaxcala Army: 800 troops	10,000–20,000 Aztec warriors

Casualties and losses
60 Spanish dead, unknown Tlaxcalan losses	Unknown

The Battle of Otumba was a major battle fought on 7 July 1520 between the Aztec Empire and its allies led by the Cihuacoatl Matlatzincátzin, and Spanish conquistadors under Hernán Cortés, alongside support from the Confederacy of Tlaxcala. The battle was fought on the plain of Temalcatitlán, near modern-day Otumba during the conquest of the Aztec Empire by Spain. The result of the battle was a successful defense for the Spanish, which allowed Cortés to reorganize his army, having suffered heavy casualties a few days before during his army's retreat from the Aztec capital Tenochtitlan, now known as La Noche Triste. A year later, by reinforcing his army with new men and supplies, and starting an alliance with the Tlaxcala Confederacy, Cortés found a way to reenter Tenochtitlan.

== Background ==
Around the end of March 1519, Hernán Cortés landed with a Spanish conquistador force at Potonchán on the coast of modern-day Mexico. Cortés had been commissioned by Governor Diego Velázquez de Cuéllar of Spanish-controlled Cuba to lead an expedition in the area, which was dominated by the Aztec Empire. However, Velázquez revoked Cortés's commission last minute, but he decided to launch his expedition regardless.

Through a combination of raw force and political maneuvering, Cortés was able to secure the allegiance of the Totonacs and the Tlaxcaltec among other groups during his advance on the Empire's main settlement, Tenochtitlan. In November, a Spanish force entered the city and was greeted by its ruler, Moctezuma II.

Initially, the conquistadors were treated well by the Aztecs while they stayed in the city, until Velázquez, angered at Cortés' disobedience, sent an armed force at the command of Pánfilo Narváez against Cortés to bring him to justice and claim the lands and riches he had conquered. Cortés was forced to leave a small garrison of men in Tenochtitlan at the command of one of his lieutenants, Pedro de Alvarado, whilst he took his small force to meet Narváez in battle. After securing a quick victory, Cortés joined Narvaez' forces to his own, and marched back to Tenochtitlán, as he had heard word that the city was up in arms against the remaining Spaniards. Upon arriving, Alvarado told Cortés' he had been convinced that the Mexica planned to attack the Spaniards and thus struck preemptively during an Aztec ritual ceremony, which caused an outrage in Tenochtitlán. The Aztecs selected a new Tlatoani after the death of Moctezuma. Before the death of Moctezuma and La Noche Triste, Cortés attempted to negotiate a peace, and as a last resort, urged Moctezuma to speak with his people to achieve a truce, but the population was angered and protested against Moctezuma. This was the state of affairs by the end of June 1520. Desperate to escape the city, and further convinced by an omen one of the Spaniards claimed to have received, the Spaniards resolved to leave the city that night in an event called La Noche Triste (The Night of Sorrows). During this attempt at salvation, however, Cortés' forces and entourage (consisting of civilian women and men of both Spanish and Mesoamerican extraction) were severely cut down. Of the Spanish force of approximately 1,300, only less than 500 men at arms escaped with their lives, along with a few hundred Tlaxcalans and civilians. Cortés then started a retreat to Tlaxcala, during which his force was harassed by Aztec skirmishers, and the Aztec leadership resolved to eliminate them as they withdrew.

== Battle ==
After being beleaguered on the causeway leading out of the city, the surviving Spanish forces arrived at the plain of Otumba, where they encountered a vast Aztec army. Despite their opponents' exhaustion and hunger, the Aztecs failed to capitalize on their numerical superiority by not attacking right away.

According to conquistador Bernal Díaz del Castillo's account of the events, it was the Castilian cavalry that was decisive for victory in the perilous battle. The Aztecs regarded the Spaniards as already defeated, and were looking to regain glory from capturing Spaniards to sacrifice to the Aztec gods. The Castilian cavalry spearheaded the attack, breaking through the ranks and decimating the Aztec lines, preparing them for the assault of the Castilian rodeleros and Tlaxcalan infantry. Though this approach was successful, the sheer numbers of the Aztecs still managed to overwhelm them.

Spanish success was also thanks to Cortés's strategy; he had instructed his troops to strike primarily at the captains and leaders of the Aztecs. Cortés himself recognized the Aztec high priest Matlatzincatl for his elaborate armor, headdress, and flag. He correctly assumed that defeating their leader and capturing their flag would result in the defeat of the Aztecs. He communicated his idea to his captains and led a charge for Matlatzincatl, followed by Gonzalo de Sandoval, Pedro de Alvarado, Cristóbal de Olid, Juan de Salamanca, and Alonso Dávila. Cortés attacked the Aztec high priest with his lance, killing him. Juan de Salamanca, who retrieved Matlatzincatl's Pāmitl, delivered it to Cortés. Seeing the death of their commander, the Aztec forces finally stopped the attacks and left the Spanish soldiers alone.

== Aftermath ==
With this victory, the Spanish conquistadors were able to reach the safe territory of Tlaxcala, regroup, and gather their strength for an eventual counter-attack deep into Aztec territory, which would result in the fall of Tenochtitlan and the colonial establishment of New Spain.

== See also ==
- Spanish conquest of the Aztec Empire
- Cristobal de Olid
- Gonzalo de Sandoval
- Dona Marina

== Sources ==
- Hewett, Edgar (1968). Ancient life in Mexico and Central America. Biblo & Tannen Publishers. ISBN 978-0-8196-0205-3.
- Robinson III, Charles (2004). The Spanish Invasion of Mexico 1519–1521. Osprey Publishing. ISBN 1-84176-563-5.
- van Zantwijk, Rudolf (1994). Brumfiel, Elizabeth; Fox, John (eds.). Factional Competition and Political Development in the New World. Cambridge University Press. ISBN 0-521-38400-1.
