= The Broken Spears =

Book by Miguel León Portilla

- First edition
- Author: Miguel León-Portilla
- Original title: Visión de los vencidos: Relaciones indígenas de la conquista
- Language: Spanish
- Subject: Spanish conquest of the Aztec Empire
- Publisher: UNAM
- Publication date: 1959
- Publication place: Mexico
- English publication date: 1962

The Broken Spears: The Aztec Account of the Conquest of Mexico (Spanish title: Visión de los vencidos: Relaciones indígenas de la conquista; lit. "Vision of the Defeated: Indigenous relations of the conquest") is a book by Mexican historian Miguel León-Portilla, translating selections of Nahuatl-language accounts of the Spanish conquest of the Aztec Empire. It was first published in Spanish in 1959, and in English in 1962. The most recent English edition was published in 2007 (ISBN 978-0807055007).

The English-language title, "The Broken Spears", comes from a phrase in one version (BnF MS 22^{bis}) of the Annals of Tlatelolco, xaxama[n]toc omitl. According to historian James Lockhart, this is a mistranslation resulting from confusion between the Nahuatl words mitl "arrow", "dart" or "spear", and omitl "bone"; an alternative translation is thus "broken bones".

== Synopsis ==
The monograph Broken Spears is structured through three distinct sections: the first is the overall introduction that León-Portilla uses to provide background for the content of the book. He describes Aztec cultural life amongst the Nahua peoples, the importance of translators that spoke Nahuatl, and the struggle of accounts that were written by eyewitnesses well after the Spanish conquest of Mexico. León-Portilla prefaces the sources he chose for the book with not only background on the events but descriptions and background information on the sources themselves. While the second and third sections follow chronologically, the first section depicts the Azteca and their initial reactions to the omens that are attributed to local Aztec mystics after the conquest that heralded the Spanish arrival.

The following sections break down the role of the proceeding war, then the effect of disease and war upon the Aztecs. León-Portilla's concise historical context and Ángel María Garibay's translations of Nahuatl passages lead into the second section of the monograph: the Aztec’s campaign against the Spanish and their defeat by a wide variety of causes, from both military conquest and disease, that is portrayed from the point of view of the natives. A notable example of Broken Spears' narrative is the exclusion of native forces allied with the Spanish Conquistadores in Mexico, as well as the influence and importance of translators, such as La Malinche.

Following these accounts, the monograph and its translated work concludes in the Aftermath, where León-Portilla highlights the "difficult relations that have always existed between the descendants of the Aztecs and their "others" – the colonial Spaniards and contemporary Mexicans." These relations are marked by letters written to the Spanish Crown, notably Philip II of Spain, directly from native individuals. The accounts vary from pleading to King Philip II for audiences, to fears manifesting in later centuries for Nahua identity clashing with colonial Spain.

== Reception ==
Written in the expanded foreword of the recent English edition, it is credited to the author that "Miguel León-Portilla has been at the forefront of the struggle to bring the voices of past and present indigenous peoples of Mexico within hearing distance of the rest of the world. And no book has contributed more to this effort than this one. From the time The Broken Spears was first published in 1959 ... hundreds of thousands of copies have appeared in Spanish alone, and many tens of thousands have been printed in French, Italian, German, Hebrew, Polish, Swedish, Hungarian, Serbo-Croatian, Portuguese, Japanese, and Catalan. The present English edition, which first came out in 1962, has gone through numerous printings, with tens of thousands of copies sold since 1974."

Popular enough to be translated into several different languages, León-Portilla’s work is regarded academically as sound and well written, particularly with the context in the original Spanish edition. Ángel María Garibay's translation is described as "subtle" and "unique and powerful: he should ideally be read in Spanish, not English." Miguel León-Portilla’s summarization of the Aztec Empire is described as "masterful" and the compilation between the translator and historian was given credit for working well together.

The opposition to the book says it is "intended for a non-expert readership" and "does not, itself, give the material for answers." Other historians give detrimental marks to the work through the elimination of accent marks and the structure of the references at the end of each chapter. Still, among its negative remarks from fellow historians, The Broken Spears is regarded as "well-organized" and is "a useful introduction and point of departure for the student interested in further research" on the subject matter.

== Translations ==
Due to the popularity and influence of The Broken Spears, several translations were made and released well after the original publication:

Year	Language	Title	Translator	Location/Publisher (of 1st edition)
1959	Spanish	Visión de los vencidos: Relaciones indígenas de la conquista (Vision of the Vanquished: Indigenous Accounts of the Conquest)	(original)	México: Universidad Nacional Autónoma de México (UNAM)
1962	English	The Broken Spears: The Aztec Account of the Conquest of Mexico	Lysander Kemp	London: Constable; Boston: Beacon Press
1962	German	Rückkehr der Götter: Die Aufzeichnungen der Azteken über den Untergang ihres Reiches (Return of the Gods: The Aztecs' Accounts of the Downfall of their Empire)	Renate Heuer	Köln: Middelhauve
1965	French	Le Crépuscule des Aztèques: Récits indigènes de la Conquête (Twilight of the Aztecs: Indigenous Accounts of the Conquest)	Madeleine Folque	Tournai, Belgium: Casterman
1967	Polish	Zmierzch Azteków: Kronika Zwyciężonych: Indiańskie relacje o podboju	María Sten, Jerzy Ficowski	Warszawa: Państ. Instytut Wydawniczy
1987	Catalan	Visió dels vençuts: relacions indígenes de la conquesta (Vision of the Vanquished: Indigenous Accounts of the Conquest)	Josep M. Murià	Barcelona: Llamp
2009	Otomi (Hñähñu)	Ra nthandi to'o bi b'edi ya njondahmä ya mudimehai dig'a ra ts'okat'ot amfeni (Vision of the Vanquished: Indigenous Accounts of the Conquest)	Raymundo Isidro Alavez	Hidalgo, Mex.: UNAM, Coordinación Humanidades

== See also ==
- Historia verdadera de la conquista de la Nueva España
- Historia general de las Indias
