= Francisco Cervantes de Salazar =

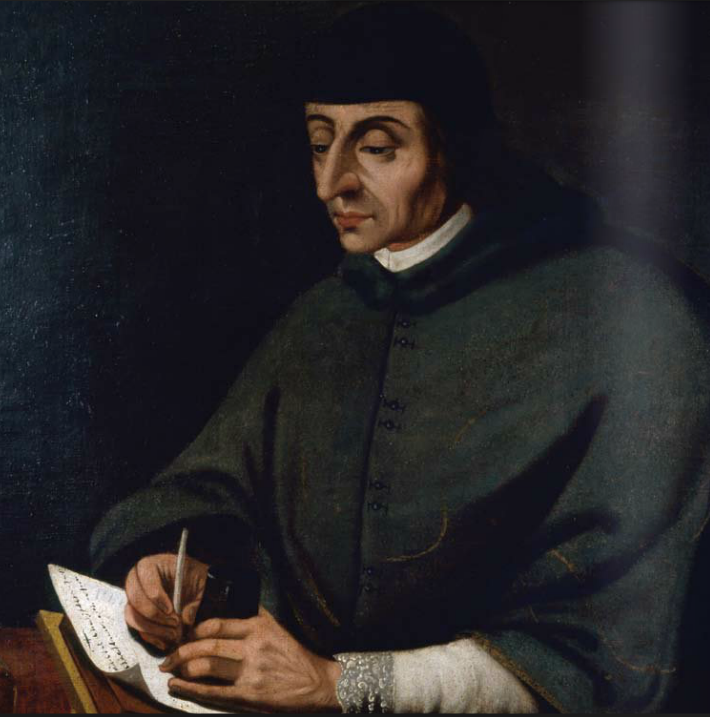
Portrait of Francisco Cervantes de Salazar by José de Bustos, Museo Soumaya.

Francisco Cervantes de Salazar (1514? – 1575) was a Spanish humanist, writer, and chronicler, considered the first professor of rhetoric at the Real y Pontificia Universidad de México.

== Biography ==
He was born in Toledo between 1514 and 1518 into a family of ancient nobility., although some sources disagree on the specificity of his date of birth. It is likely that Cervantes de Salazar was the student of Alejo de Vanegas, who was in turn friend of Spain-born humanist Juan Luis Vives. He studied at the University of Salamanca, where he obtained the degree of bachiller in canon law. In his youth he accompanied Pedro Girón on a diplomatic mission to Flanders, an experience that allowed him to frequent humanist circles and to meet Juan Luis Vives.

After returning to Spain, he entered the service of Cardinal García de Loaísa as Latin secretary. Loaísa was archbishop of Seville and president of the Council of the Indies. In 1544 he published a translation of Vives’s Introductio ad sapientiam, followed by the Apólogo de la ociosidad y el trabajo by Luis Mexía and the Diálogo de la dignidad del hombre by Fernán Pérez de Oliva, all of which he enriched with notes and glosses. After the deaths of Loaísa (1546) and Hernán Cortés (1547), with whom he had come into contact in his final years, he moved to the Americas. Arriving in Mexico City around 1551, he taught Latin grammar and from 1553 held the chair of rhetoric at the newly founded Real y Pontificia Universidad de México, where he delivered the inaugural lecture. Nevertheless, he started teaching the rhetoric course two years after the official inauguration of the university. He was around 30 years old when he arrived to New Spain.

The Real y Pontificia Universidad de México followed the European tradition of trivium, that is, the teaching of rhetoric, grammar (Latin grammar, not Spanish grammar), and logic, which demanded professors of rhetoric, like Cervantes de Salazar. While the indigenous cultures had reading and writing systems of their own, the Spanish conquistadors probably concluded the European writing systems were better means of communication. Because of this, the possibility of teaching the writing systems of the original groups was not considered (indigenous languages were taught at the university level: however, students would write in indigenous languages using the Roman, Western alphabet, not the writing systems of the local populations). In this sense, the pedagogy of Cervantes de Salazar was completely Western-based.

Some sources have considered Cervantes de Salazar to be also one of the first professor of grammar in New Spain. While it is most likely that he indeed taught grammar in New Spain, he probably taught it outside of the university, since, even before the establishment of the Royal University, some other schools were also founded in New Spain, including higher-education institutions, like the Colegio de Tlatelolco, established by the Franciscan order between 1533 and 1536. Yet, some scholars have suggested he indeed taught both grammar and rhetoric at the university. In a stricter sense, Blas de Bustamante was only the first professor of rhetoric at the Real y Pontificia Universidad de México. He used to earn around 150 annually for his teaching at the university.

Despite his fame as the first rhetoric professor in New Spain, Western rhetoric was present in what would become México since Conquest, considering the epistolary work of conquistadors like Hernán Cortés. In fact, part of the conquest expedition of Cortés was achieved through persuasion and rhetoric.

In 1554 he published a commentary on the Dialogues by Vives, integrating them with seven original dialogues in Latin, three of which constitute a valuable description of the capital of New Spain. His edition of the Dialogues by Vives include commentary by Pedro de Mota,

Ordained a priest in 1555, he obtained various academic degrees up to a doctorate in theology. He served several times as rector of the University and as a canon of Mexico City Cathedral. In 1560 he published the Túmulo Imperial, a description of the solemn funeral rites celebrated in Mexico for Charles V. He also participated in inquisitorial activities and served as an adviser to the Holy Office. Although he aspired to further ecclesiastical advancement, he never rose beyond the dignity of canon.

Professors at that time had relative liberty to choose the texts to read from during his courses (reading and commenting on specific books and authors was the predominant teaching style at the time^{[1]}). in the case of Cervantes de Salazar, besides the dialogues by Vives, he probably used the books from his library. These were Roman literature, as well as Renaissance and Classical treatises on rhetoric. Among the rhetorical studies, his library had these books:

- De Ratione Docendi Libri Duo, by Alfonso García Matamoros; ·
- Progymnasmata Artis Rhetoricae, by Joannes Petti;
- Dialectica, by Titelman;
- De Copia Verborum ac Rerum, Rectorica, De Conscribendis Epistolis, and Adagia, by Erasmus.

In terms of Classical literature, his library had books by Plutarch, Plinius, Ovid, Quintilian, Livy, Martial, Tacitus, Quintus Curtius Rufus, Cicero, and Horace.

Even though rhetoric consists of several topics (in De Inventione, Cicero talks about give cannons: inventio, dispositio, elocutio, memoria, and pronuntiatio), Cervantes seemed to follow the tradition of understanding rhetoric as style mainly. In a metafictional dialogue Cervantes himself wrote about him and his teaching in New Spain, he has a couple of students talking about Cervantes in a written dialogue, which emphasizes the aspect of eloquence, that is, speaking and writing with elegance. From this dialogue it's also possible to infer that Cervantes taught students from different schools (facultades), which suggests the practical applicability of rhetoric as a field that Cervantes viewed in rhetoric instruction.

Despite his role as a professor, he was also a student at the recentlly-established university. He studied what was known as arts (artes) and theology. One of his professors was Alonso de la Vera Cruz.

Despite the university lacked a specific curricula, compared to contemporary universities, Cervantes, and some other professors, had an idea of educational progress for students, as the books Cervantes possessed shows that rhetoric was possibly taught after grammar.

Cervantes taught at a time when the university faced a serious of challenges, due to its recent establishment in New Spain. The presence of the Jesuits, who established several secondary schools in New Spain, weakened courses like the ones Cervantes taught, as some students were more interested in attenting the classes offered by the Jesuits than the ones offered at the university. He left proof, however, that he had more ambitious plans

There is evidence that suggests that Cervantes de Salazar didn’t want to teach at the Royal University, since he stopped showing up to his rhetoric course by 1557 and another professor, Dr. Gutiérrez, had to replace him. He taught rhetoric for four years. While there is no concrete proof, it is possible that Cervantes stopped teaching at the university because of the relatively few students attending his courses.

He died in Mexico City on 14 November 1575, leaving behind a rich library and unfinished manuscripts.

== Works ==
=== Crónica de la Nueva España ===
The Crónica de la Nueva España is an unfinished historical work written between about 1557 and 1564 in Mexico City. It is considered one of the earliest historiographical chronicles composed in New Spain. The work was commissioned from Cervantes de Salazar by the cabildo (city council) of Mexico City, which from 1558 granted him an annual salary and the assistance of an amanuensis for its composition. The chronicler began writing the text shortly after 1557 and continued for several years, but never completed it.

The Crónica is inspired by the Conquista de México of Francisco López de Gómara, but Cervantes did not limit himself to reproducing that model: he compared various sources and collected direct testimonies from elderly conquistadors still living in Mexico. Certain episodes, such as the adventures of Gerónimo de Aguilar, the Noche Triste, or the siege of Tenochtitlán, are narrated in versions that are more detailed and divergent than those found in earlier chronicles. The work deals primarily with the discovery and conquest of New Spain, interweaving historical and geographical descriptions. It includes chapters devoted to the fauna and geography of the territory, as well as an expanded description of Mexico City, also based on the Latin dialogues that Cervantes had published in 1554. The narrative is marked by literary vividness: figures ranging from Hernán Cortés to Moctezuma II are portrayed with human traits, and the style alternates concise sententiae with oratorical eloquence, in accordance with models of Renaissance historiography.

The manuscript remained unpublished and unfinished. It was delivered in installments to the cabildo, in fascicles, but was never printed in its entirety. In the 17th century it was extensively used by Antonio de Herrera y Tordesillas for his Historia general de los hechos de los castellanos en las islas y tierra firme del mar océano. The text survives in a manuscript version, now preserved in Mexico, and is considered one of the most significant sources for colonial history.

=== Others ===
- Epístola laudatoria (1542)
- Introducción para ser sabio (1544)
- Epístola laudatoria a Juan Maldonado (1545)
- Obras que Francisco Cervantes de Salazar ha hecho, glosado y traduzido (1546)
- Epístola laudatoria (Arte trifaria) (1550)
- Commentaria in Ludovici Vives Exercitationes Linguae Latinae (1554)
- México en 1554 (1554), a collection of Latin dialogues describing the city of Mexico in 1554
- Túmulo imperial de la gran ciudad de México (1560)
- Epístola dedicatoria al virrey Martín Enríquez (1570)
- Prólogo al Speculum coniugiorum (1572)

== Editions ==
- Cervantes de Salazar, Francisco (1546). Works that Francisco Cervantes de Salazar has done, glossed, and translated. Francisco Cerdá y Rico (ed.).
- Cervantes de Salazar, Francisco (1560). Imperial Tomb of the Great City of Mexico. Antonio de Espinosa.
- Cervantes de Salazar, Francisco (1575). Chronicle of New Spain, its description, its quality and temperament, the property and nature of the Indians.
- Chronicle of New Spain:
  - Cervantes de Salazar, Francisco (1914). Francisco del Paso y Troncoso (ed.). Chronicle of New Spain. Papers of New Spain. Madrid: Hauser and Menet.
  - Cervantes de Salazar, Francisco (1914). Manuel Magallón (ed.). Chronicle of New Spain. Madrid: The Hispanic Society of America.
  - Cervantes de Salazar, Francisco (1971). Agustín Millares Carlo, Manuel Magallón (ed.). Chronicle of New Spain. Madrid: Atlas Editions.
  - Cervantes de Salazar, Francisco (1985). Juan Miralles Ostos (ed.). Chronicle of New Spain. Porrúa Library. Mexico: Porrúa.
  - Cervantes de Salazar, Francisco (2008). Chronicle of New Spain. Barcelona: Linkgua Editions. ISBN 978-84-9897-316-7.
- Mexico in 1554 / Dialogues:
  - Cervantes de Salazar, Francisco (1875). Joaquín García Icazbalceta (ed.). Mexico in 1554. Three Latin dialogues that Francisco Cervantes de Salazar wrote and printed in Mexico in that year. Mexico: Former Bookstore of Andrade and Morales.
  - Cervantes de Salazar, Francisco (1953). Carlos Eduardo Castañeda (ed.). Life in the imperial and loyal city of Mexico in New Spain and the Royal and Pontifical University of Mexico as described in the Dialogues for the study of the Latin language prepared by Francisco Cervantes de Salazar for use in his classes and printed in 1554 by Juan Pablos. Translated by Minnie Lee Barret Shepard. Austin: University of Texas Press.
  - Cervantes de Salazar, Francisco (1963). Edmundo O'Gorman (ed.). Mexico in 1554 and the Imperial Tomb. Mexico: Porrúa.
  - Cervantes de Salazar, Francisco (1993). Mexico in 1554. Mexico: National Autonomous University of Mexico. ISBN 978-968-36-3043-8.
  - Cervantes de Salazar, Francisco (2001). Mexico in 1554. Three Latin dialogues by Cervantes de Salazar. Mexico: National Autonomous University of Mexico. ISBN 978-968-36-9613-7.
