= Otumba =

- Municipality
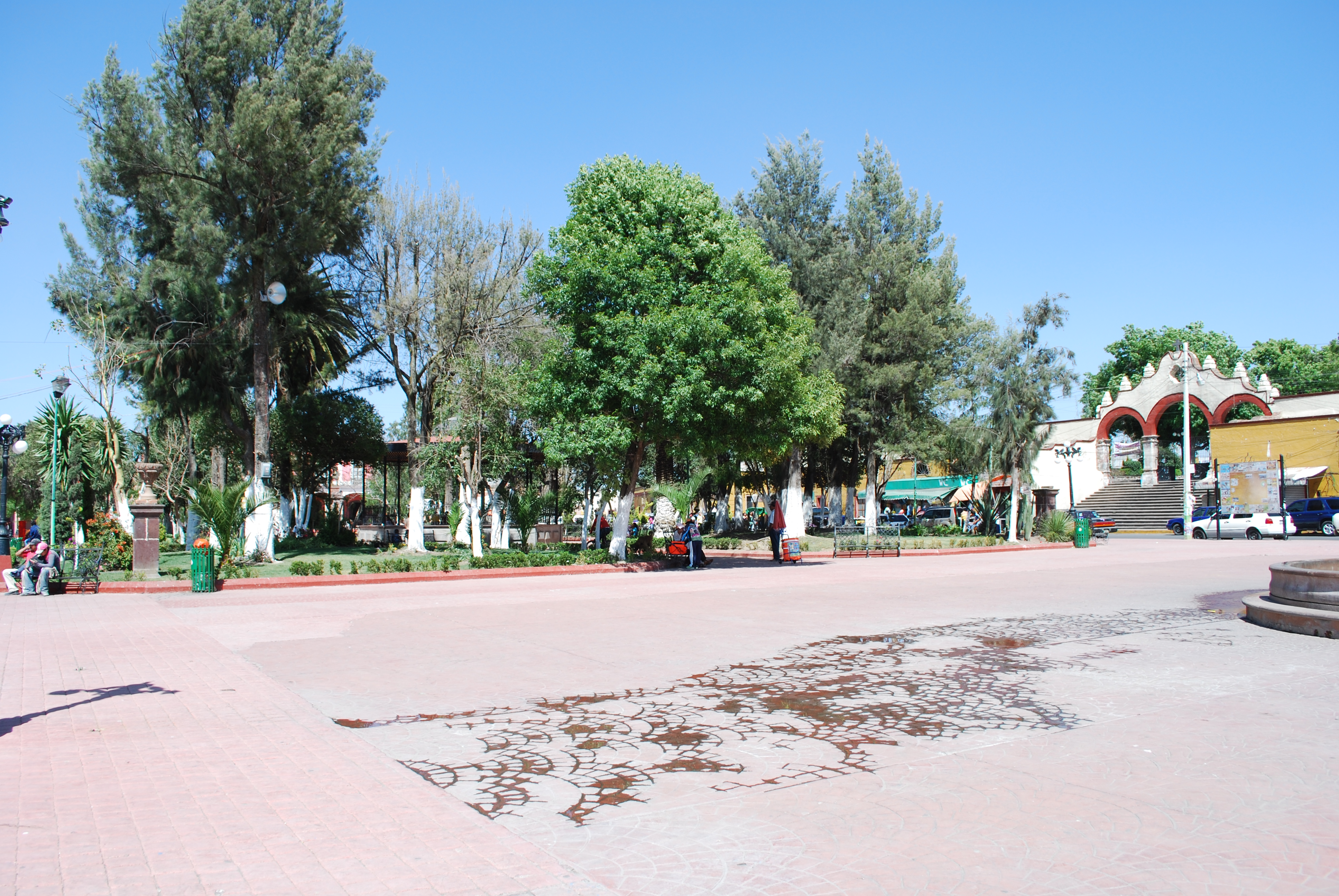
- Main plaza

- Location within Mexico
- Coordinates: 19°42′00″N 98°45′20″W
- Country: Mexico
- State: State of Mexico
- Municipal Seat: Otumba de Gómez Farías
- Municipality Founded: 1824
- Elevation (of seat): 2,360 m (7,740 ft)

Population (2005) Municipality
  - Municipality: 29,873
  - Seat: 9,242
- Time zone: UTC-6 (CST)
- Postal code (of seat): 55900
- Website: www.otumba.com/portal/ (in Spanish)

Otumba is a municipality in the State of Mexico in Mexico. The municipal seat and largest town is Otumba de Gómez Farías. The municipality of Otumba has a land area of some 143.42 square kilometres (55 mi^{2}), and a population recorded in the intermedial 2005 census, the Conteo de Población y Vivienda, of 29,873.

== Geography ==
=== Localities ===
Towns, villages and named localities (localidades) within Otumba municipality include: San Martín, Ahuatepec (Ahuatepec), Belém, Buenavista, San José Coamilpa (Ejido de Otumba), Coyotepec, Cuautlacingo, Rancho el Mayorazgo, Oxtotipac, Rancho las Papas (Rancho de Don Jorge Olvera), Poyoxco, San Francisco Tlaltica, Rancho San Lorenzo, San Marcos (San Marcos Tlaxuchilco), San Miguel Xolco, Santa Bárbara, Santiago Tolman, San Juan Tocuila (Tocuila), Barrio Xamimilolpa (Xolpa), Xochihuacán, Tepa Grande (Rancho Guadalupe Tepa), Tlalmimilolpa, San José de las Presas (Cuautenco), Colonias Jacarandas, Rancho San Nicolás Tlaxomulco, Santa Gertrudis, Campero (Ejido San Marcos), Ejido Buenavista (La Mocha), Colonia Coamilpa, Colonia Chacalco, Rancho Santa Brígida, Tlahuico, Tecalco, La Zumbona, Granja San Cosme, Santiago Tolman, San Telmo, Santa Bárbara (Ejido Santa Bárbara), Colonia los Capulines, Granja los Conquianes, Colonia los Remedios, Rancho la Puente, Granja Liberacos Uno, El Colorado, El Monte, Jagüeycillos, Rancho ZR, La Cruz, San Miguel Axalco Chico, Nueva Colonia de Axalco, and El Potrero.

=== Terrain and land use ===
Approximately 15% of Otumba's territory is hilly and mountainous terrain, a further 40% is sloping or undulating land. The remaining 45% is level plains and valleys. Elevation above mean sea level ranges from 2,300 to 2,900 metres (7,546 to 9,514 ft).

Principal land usage is agricultural farmland, totalling 8,537 hectares (21,100 acres) or almost 60% the total land area. Another 1,056 hectares (2,610 acres) or approximately 7% is dedicated to livestock farming. Forest cover is less than 1%, at about 59.2 hectares (146 acres).

== Economy ==
The main economic activity is within the farming and retail sectors. The agricultural sector includes livestock raising such as cattle, pigs, goats, sheep, horses, domestic fowl, rabbits and bees.

Trade is an important activity for the municipality's economy, including establishments as general stores, construction supply, pharmacies, butcher shops, stationery stores, and others.
