= La Noche Triste =

Event during the Conquest of Mexico

La Noche Triste (The Night of Sorrows) or Noche Victoriosa (Victorious Night)
- Part of the Spanish conquest of the Aztec Empire
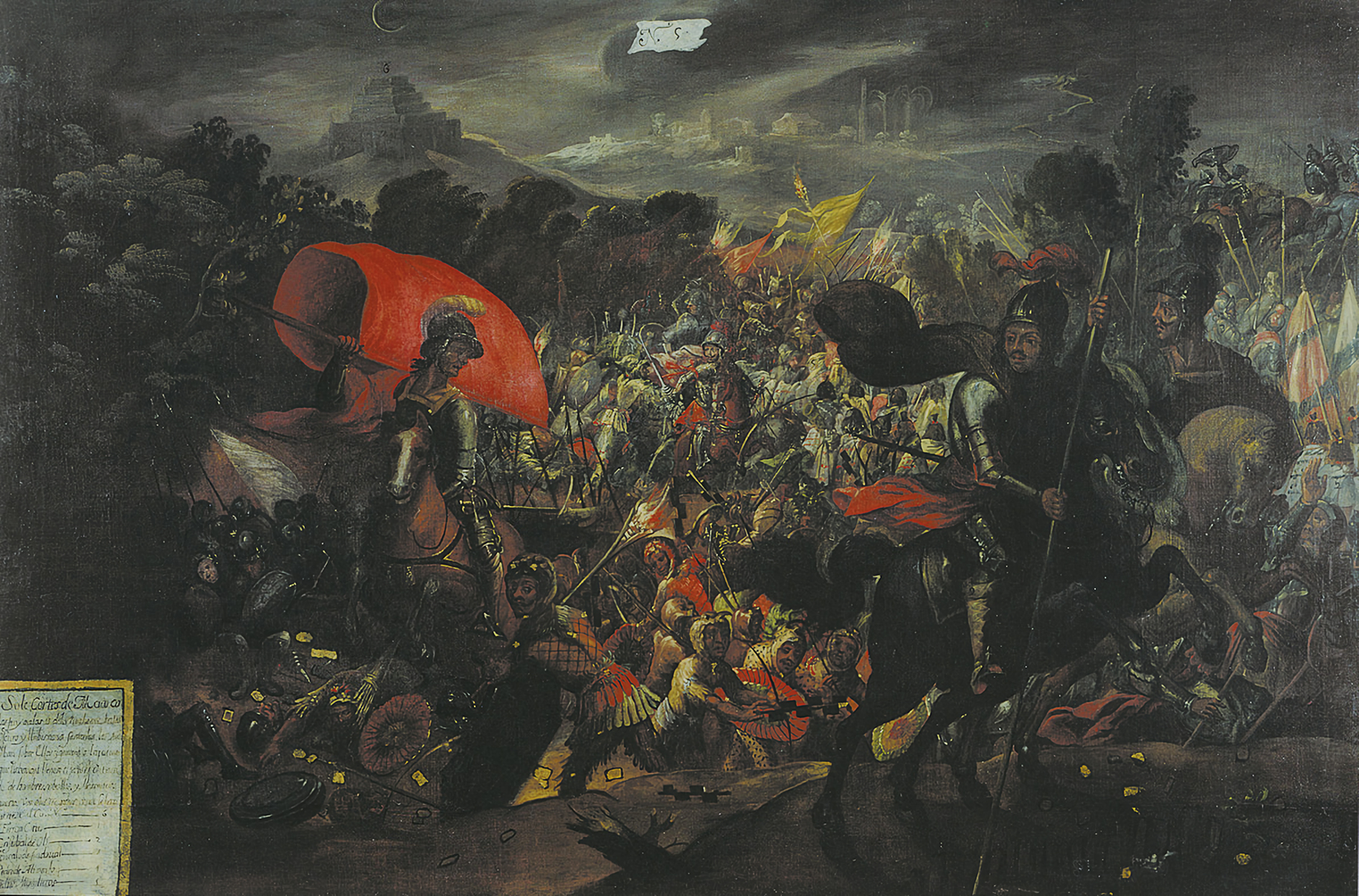
- Noche Triste
Date	June 30 – July 1, 1520
Location	Shores of Lake Texcoco, Mexico
Result	Mexica victory

Belligerents
Crown of Castile; Spanish Empire; Confederacy of Tlaxcala	Mexica Triple Alliance

Commanders and leaders
Hernán Cortés (WIA); Pedro de Alvarado (WIA); Gonzalo de Sandoval; Diego de Ordaz; Francisco de Saucedo; Francisco de Lugo; Alonso de Ávila; Cristóbal de Olid; Juan Velázquez de León †	Cuitláhuac

Strength
Varies; likely 1,000–2,000 Spanish and 12,000 Tlaxcaltec native allies	20,000 Aztec warriors; likely more in reserves

Casualties and losses
Between 800 and 1200 Spanish killed, drowned, or captured; around 4,000 Tlaxcaltecs killed or captured	Unknown

La Noche Triste ("The Night of Sorrows", literally "The Sad Night"), officially called in Mexico Victorious Night, was an important event during the Spanish conquest of the Aztec Empire, where Hernán Cortés and his army of Spanish conquistadors, including their native allies were driven out of the Mexica capital, Tenochtitlan.

== Prologue ==
Cortés' expedition arrived at Tenochtitlan on November 8, 1519, taking up residence in a specially designated compound in the city. Soon thereafter, suspecting treachery on the part of their hosts, the Spaniards took Moctezuma II, the Aztec ruler or Tlatoani, hostage. Though Moctezuma followed Cortés' instructions in continually assuring his subjects that he had been ordered by the gods to move in with the Spaniards and that he had done so willingly, the population began to turn against both the Spaniards and Moctezuma. During the following 98 days, Cortés and his native allies, the Tlaxcaltecs, were increasingly unwelcome guests in the capital.

=== Cortés heads off Spanish punitive expedition ===
In May 1520, news from the Gulf coast reached Cortés that a much larger party of Spaniards had been sent by Governor Velázquez of Cuba to arrest Cortés for insubordination. Leaving Tenochtitlan in the care of his trusted lieutenant, Pedro de Alvarado, Cortés marched to the coast, where he defeated the Cuban expedition led by Pánfilo de Narváez sent to capture him. When Cortés told the defeated soldiers about the riches of Tenochtitlan, they agreed to join him. Reinforced by Narvaez's men, Cortés headed back to Tenochtitlan.

=== Loss of control in Tenochtitlan ===
During Cortés's absence, Pedro de Alvarado oversaw a slaughter of Aztec nobles and priests celebrating a festival in the city's main temple due to fears of an Aztec revolt. In retaliation, the Aztecs laid siege to the Spanish compound, in which Moctezuma was still being held captive. By the time Cortés returned to Tenochtitlan in late June, the Aztecs had elected a new Tlatoani named Cuitláhuac.

Cortés ordered Moctezuma to address his people from a terrace in order to persuade them to stop fighting and to allow the Spaniards to leave the city in peace. The Aztecs, however, jeered at Moctezuma, and pelted him with stones and darts. By Spanish accounts, he was killed in this assault by the Aztecs, though the Aztecs claim he had been killed instead by the Spanish.

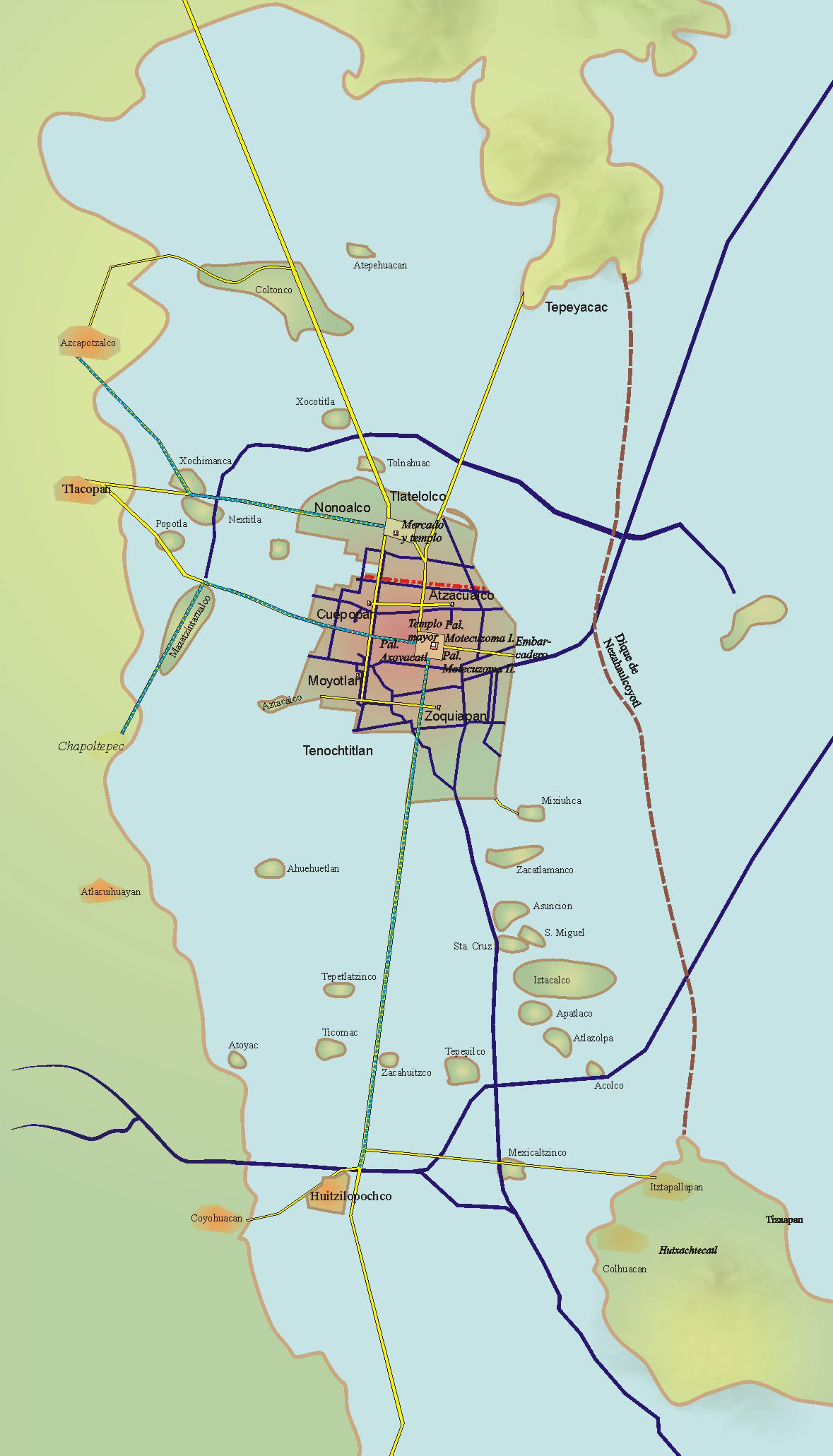
A map of Tenochtitlan and its causeways leading out of the capital

With Moctezuma dead, Cortés and Alvarado knew they were in a precarious position. Under constant attack, with gunpowder, food, and water in short supply, Cortés decided to break out of the city by night. In order to put the Aztecs off their guard, he sent messengers asking for a one-week ceasefire, at the end of which the Spaniards would return any treasure of which they were in possession and would be permitted to leave the city peacefully.

Since the Aztecs had damaged bridges on four of the eight causeways into the island city, the Spaniards devised a portable bridge they could use in order to cross any unspanned sections of water. Cortés ordered that as much of the accumulated gold and other treasure as was feasible be packed and carried away, and invited the Spanish soldiers to take and carry away as much as they wished of the remainder. This invitation would lead to the demise of many soldiers who, overburdened with treasure, found it impossible to navigate the causeways and other obstacles encountered on the way out of the city.

Cortés ultimately would have to choose among three land routes: north to Tlatelolco, which was the least dangerous path but required the longest trip through the city; south to Coyohuacan and Iztapalapa, two towns that would not welcome the Spanish; or west to Tlacopan, which required the shortest trip through Tenochtitlan, though they would not be welcome there either. Cortés selected the western causeway to Tlacopan, needing the quickest route out of Tenochtitlan with all his provisions and people.

=== Spanish head for the causeway out ===
On the night of July 1, 1520, Cortez's large army left their compound and headed west, toward the Tlacopan causeway. The causeway was apparently unguarded, and the Spaniards made their way out of their complex unnoticed, winding their way through the sleeping city under the cover of a rainstorm. Before reaching the causeway, they were noticed by the elite Aztec soldiers known as the Eagle Warriors, who sounded the alarm. The alarm was then shouted by others, first by a woman drawing water, and then by the priest of Huītzilōpōchtli from atop Templo Mayor.

As the alarm spread, numerous Aztec warriors, noblemen and commoners alike, emerged from their houses and began attacking the Spaniards at every direction from their canoes or on the causeway with macuahuitl swords, spears, arrows, and stones thrown from slings. The fighting was ferocious. As the Spaniards and their native allies reached the causeway, hundreds of canoes appeared in the waters alongside to harry them. The Spaniards fought their way across the causeway in the rain. Weighed down by gold and equipment, some of the soldiers lost their footing, fell into the lake, and drowned. Amid a vanguard of horsemen, Cortés pressed ahead and reached dry land at Tacuba, leaving the rest of the expedition to fend for itself in the treacherous crossing. Díaz del Castillo later defended his action, stating that trying to stay and fight for the rest would have likely concluded with all of them wiped out.

Seeing the wounded survivors straggle into the village, Cortés and his horsemen turned back to the causeway, where they encountered Pedro de Alvarado, unhorsed and badly wounded, in the company of a handful of Spaniards and Tlaxcaltecs. According to Bernal Díaz del Castillo, it was at this point that tears came to Cortés' eyes, as he realized the extent of the debacle.

Cortés, Alvarado and the strongest and most skilled of the men had managed to fight their way out of Tenochtitlan, although they were all bloodied and exhausted. Cortés himself had been injured in the fighting. All of the artillery had been lost, as had most of the horses.

The sources are not in agreement as to the total number of casualties suffered by the expedition. Cortés himself claimed that 154 Spaniards were lost along with over 2,000 native allies. Thoan Cano, another eyewitness to the event, said that 1,170 Spaniards died, but this number probably exceeds the total number of Spaniards who took part in the expedition. Francisco López de Gómara, who was not himself an eyewitness, estimated that 450 Spaniards and 4,000 allies died. Díaz del Castillo, who was an eyewitness, talks about around 450 Spaniards and 1,000 allies killed.

Montezuma's son, Chimalpopoca was killed; Tepanec prince Tlaltecatzin, King Cacamatzin, his three sisters and two brothers were also killed.

Diaz states the Spaniards suffered 860 soldiers killed, which included those from the later Battle of Otumba. The Tlaxcaltecs lost a thousand. The noncombatants attached to the expedition suffered terribly, 72 casualties, including five Spanish women. The few women who survived included La Malinche the interpreter, Doña Luisa, and María Estrada. The event was named La Noche Triste ("The Night of Sorrows") on account of the sorrow that Cortés and his surviving followers felt and expressed at the loss of life and treasure incurred in the escape from Tenochtitlan.

== Aftermath ==
Further battles awaited the Spaniards and their allies as they fought their way around the north end of Lake Zumpango. One week later, at the Battle of Otumba, not far from Teotihuacan, they turned to fight the pursuing Aztecs, decisively defeating them—according to Cortés, because he slew the Aztec commander—and giving the Spaniards a small respite that allowed them to reach Tlaxcala.

It was in Tlaxcala that Cortés planned the siege of Tenochtitlan and the eventual destruction of the Aztec Empire.

== See also ==
- List of battles won by Indigenous peoples of the Americas
- History of the Aztecs
- History of Mexico
- Juan Velázquez de León
- Cristóbal de Olid
- Gonzalo de Sandoval
- Dona Marina
