= Tlaxcala (Nahua state) =

Pre-Columbian state in present-day central Mexico (1348–1520)

Coordinates: 19°25′44″N 98°09′39″W

Confederacy of Tlaxcala Tlahtōlōyān Tlaxcallan (Classical Nahuatl)
- 1348–1520
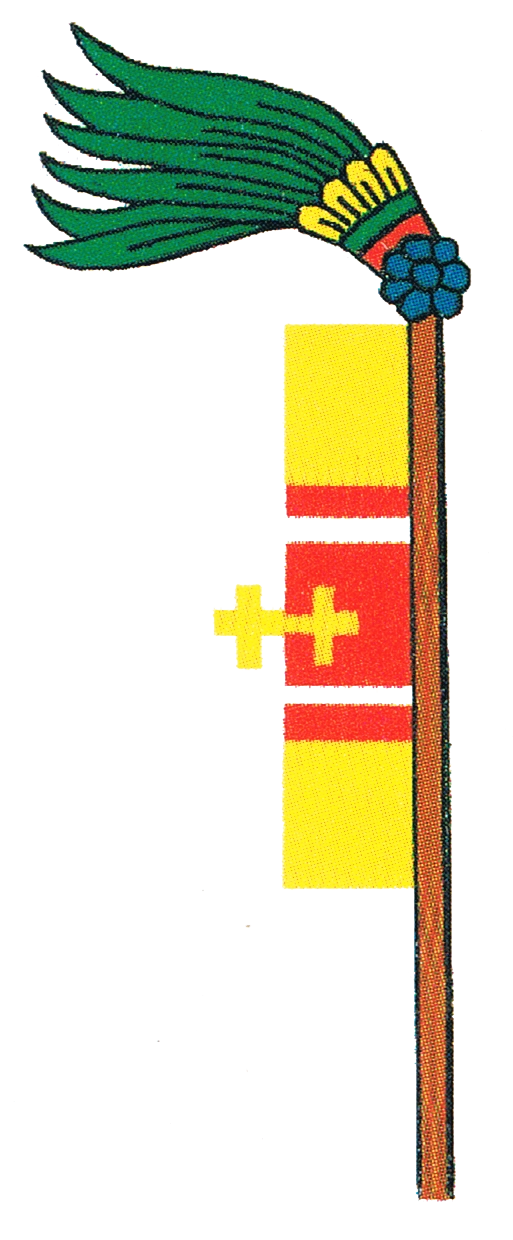
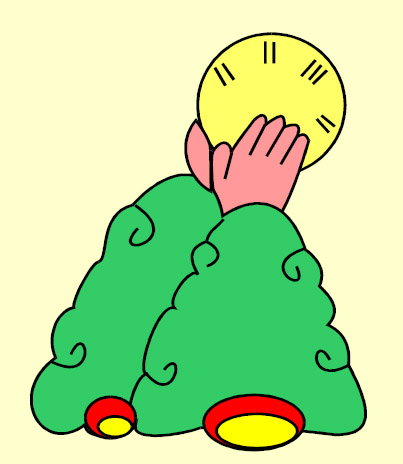
- Battle vexilloid worn by Tlaxcalan warriors who fought alongside the Spanish (Lienzo de Tlaxcala) Glyph

- Tlaxcala was surrounded by the Aztec Empire in 1519.

- Location of the polity
- Capital: Tlaxcala
- Common languages: Nahuatl (Official)
- Religion: Nahua religion, with Camaxtli as patron deity
- Demonym: Tlaxcaltec
- Government: Confederation
- Tlatoani of Tlaxcala
  - 1348: Culhuatecuhtli
- Historical era: Post Classic /Early Modern
  - Tlaxcaltec migration to Central Mexico: 1348
  - Spanish conquest of the Aztec Empire: 1520

Population
  - 1348: ?
  - early 15th century: 650,000
  - 1519: 300,000
- Currency: Quachtli, Cacao
Preceded by
Tepeticpac
Ocotelolco
Tizatlan
Quiahuiztlan
Succeeded by
New Spain
- Today part of: Tlaxcala, Mexico

Tlaxcala (Classical Nahuatl: Tlaxcallān [t͡ɬaʃˈkalːaːn̥], 'place of maize tortillas'; Otomian languages: Mãhmê, "place of tortillas") was a pre-Columbian city and state in central Mexico.

Tlaxcala was completely surrounded by Aztec lands, leading to intermittent armed conflict between the two powers as the latter attempted to absorb the former into its empire. In the reign of Motecuhzoma I, the Aztec Triple Alliance instituted a policy of instead fighting so-called "Flower(y) Wars" against Tlaxcala (as well as other city-states; namely, Huexotzinco and Cholula)—purportedly in order to obtain prisoners-of-war for ritual sacrifice—and imposed a trade embargo upon Tlaxcala specifically, in an apparent effort to weaken or punish the recalcitrant polity.

This long history of conflict between the Aztecs and the Tlaxcalteca played a role in the course of events during the Spanish conquest of the Aztec Empire: the Tlaxcalteca—seizing the chance to strike back against their hated Aztec enemies—allied with the Spanish Empire, supplying a large contingent for the multi-ethnic, Spanish-led army that eventually destroyed the Empire.

== History ==
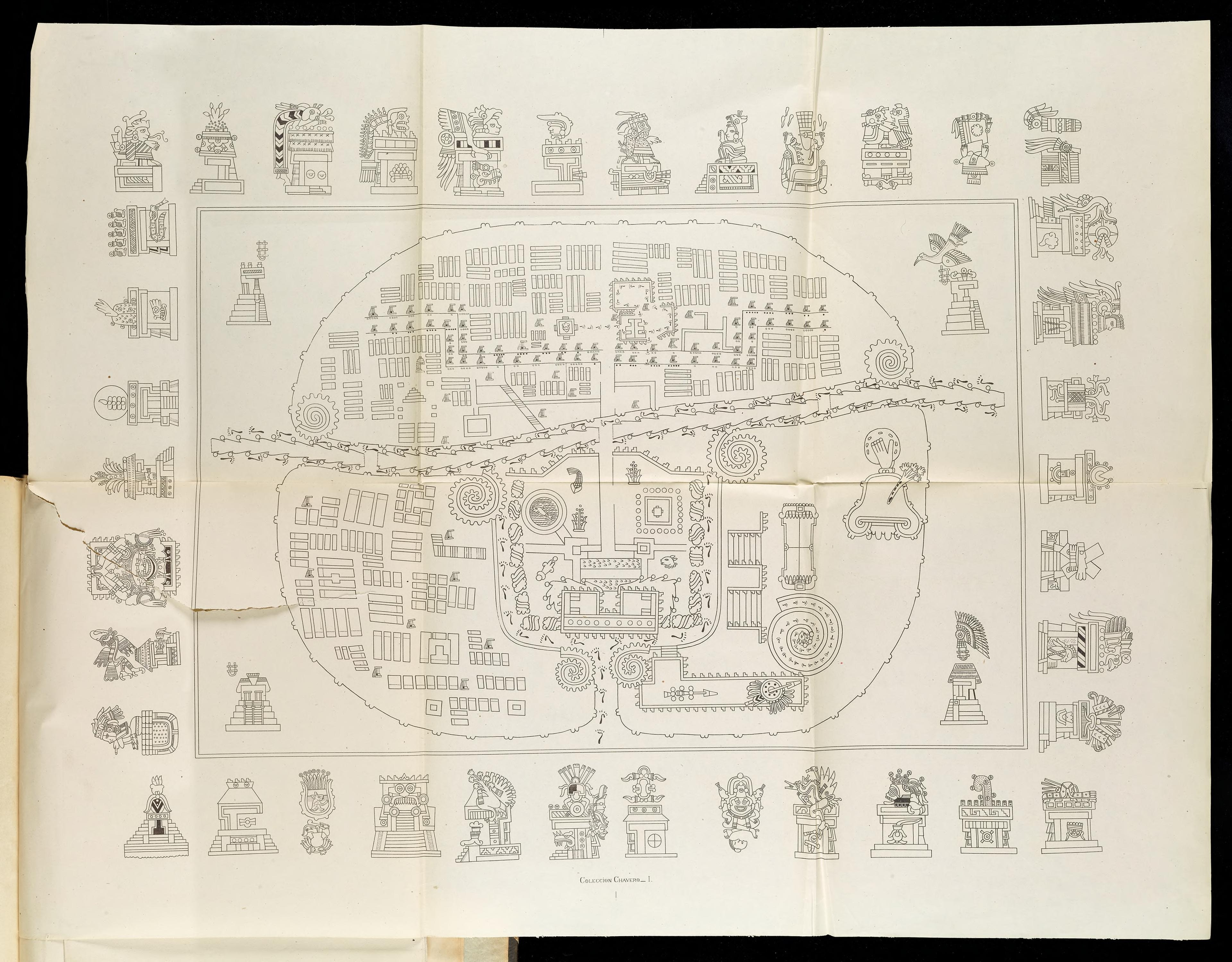
A Map of Tlaxcala: The top-right hand sector is Tizatlan, bottom-right Quiahuiztlan, top-left Ocotelolco, and bottom-left Tepeticpac. The river Atzompa crosses the city from north to south (left to right, the map being oriented east–west). From Alfredo Chavero, Pinturas Jeroglíficas, Mexico 1901.

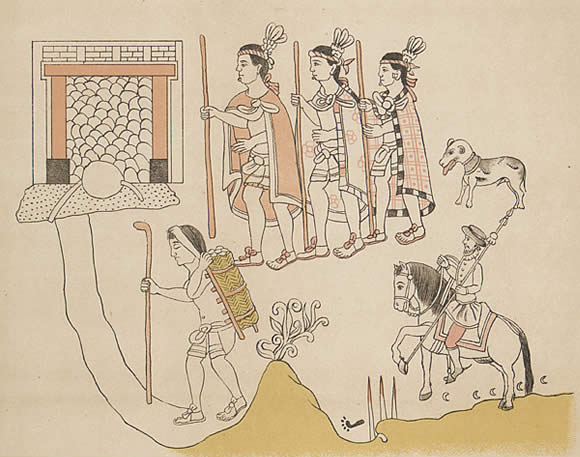
Tlaxcaltecâ allies accompany Hernán Cortés during the Spanish conquest of the Aztec empire, 1519, from the History of Tlaxcala.

The Tlaxcalteca arrived in Central Mexico during the Late Postclassic. They first settled near Texcoco in the valley of Mexico, between the settlement of Cohuatlinchan and the shore of Lake Texcoco. After some years the Tlaxcalteca were driven out of the valley of Mexico and moved to the east, splitting into three groups along the way. While one group continued north towards the modern state of Hidalgo, and another remained in the vicinity of Texcoco, a third group arrived in the modern valley of Tlaxcala, where they established the city of Tepetícpac Texcallan under the leadership of Culhuatecuhtli Quanex.

Over the subsequent years, the Tlaxcalan state expanded with the foundations of Ocotelulco and Tizatlán. The fourth major settlement, Quiahuiztlan, was founded by members of the Tlaxcalan group that had initially remained in the valley of Mexico.

List of Tlatoque of the Tlaxcallan Altepemeh
Tepeticpac	Ocotelolco	Tizatlan	Quiahuiztlan
		Señor de Aztahua de Tizatlan	
	Cuitlixcatl	Xayacamach	
Tlahuexolotzin	Maxixcatl	Xicotencatl I	Citlalpopocatzin
	Lorenzo Maxixcatl		

== Government ==
Ancient Tlaxcala was a republic ruled by a council of between 50 and 200 chief political officials (pl. teteuctin; sg. teuctli). These officials gained their positions through service to the state, usually in warfare, and as a result came from both the noble (pilli) and commoner (macehualli) classes.

== Culture ==
Three languages were spoken in Tlaxcala: Nahuatl, Otomi by a large minority, and "Pinome" (likely Popoloca) by a smaller minority. Later, Aztec conquests resulted in further waves of Otomi migration to Tlaxcala, such as from Xaltocan. A dialect of Otomi is still spoken in Tlaxcala today.

The Tlaxcaltec calendar mostly corresponded to the Aztec one, but a few veintenas were known by different names: Xilomanaliztli ("offering of jilotes") instead of Atlcahualo, Coailhuitl ("feast of the serpent") or Xilopehualiztli ("the jilotes begin") instead of Tlacaxipehualiztli, Pachtzintli ("hay") instead of Teotleco, and Hueypachtli ("great hay") instead of Tepeilhuitl.

== Contact with conquistadors ==
Tlaxcala was never conquered by the Aztec Empire, but was engaged in a state of perpetual war, the so-called "flower wars" or "garland wars".

Conquistador Bernal Díaz del Castillo describes the first battle between the Spanish force and the Tlaxcalteca as surprisingly difficult; he writes that they—the Spanish—would probably have not survived, had not Xicotencatl the Elder and Maxixcatzin persuaded Xicotencatl the Younger, the Tlaxcalan warleader, that it would be better to ally with the newcomers than to kill them. Xicohtencatl the Younger was later—in April 1521—condemned by the Tlaxcalan ruling council and hanged by Cortés, for desertion during the siege of Tenochtitlan.

Due to protracted warfare between the Aztecs and the Tlaxcalteca, the latter were eager to exact revenge, and soon became loyal allies of the Spanish. Even after the Spanish were expelled from Tenochtitlan, the Tlaxcalteca continued their support. Tlaxcala also assisted the Spanish in the conquest of Guatemala.

As a result of the alliance with the Spaniards, Tlaxcala had hidalgo privileged status within "New Spain", as confirmed in the Royal Writ of the Foundation of the City of Tlaxcala, Mexico. After the Spanish conquered Tenochtitlan and the rest of Mexico, Tlaxcala was allowed to survive and preserve its pre-Columbian culture. In addition, as a reward for the unyielding loyalty the Tlaxcalan federation had shown the Spanish, the city and its inhabitants largely escaped the pillaging and destruction following the Spanish conquest. The Tlaxcalteca gave further assistance in the Mixtón War.

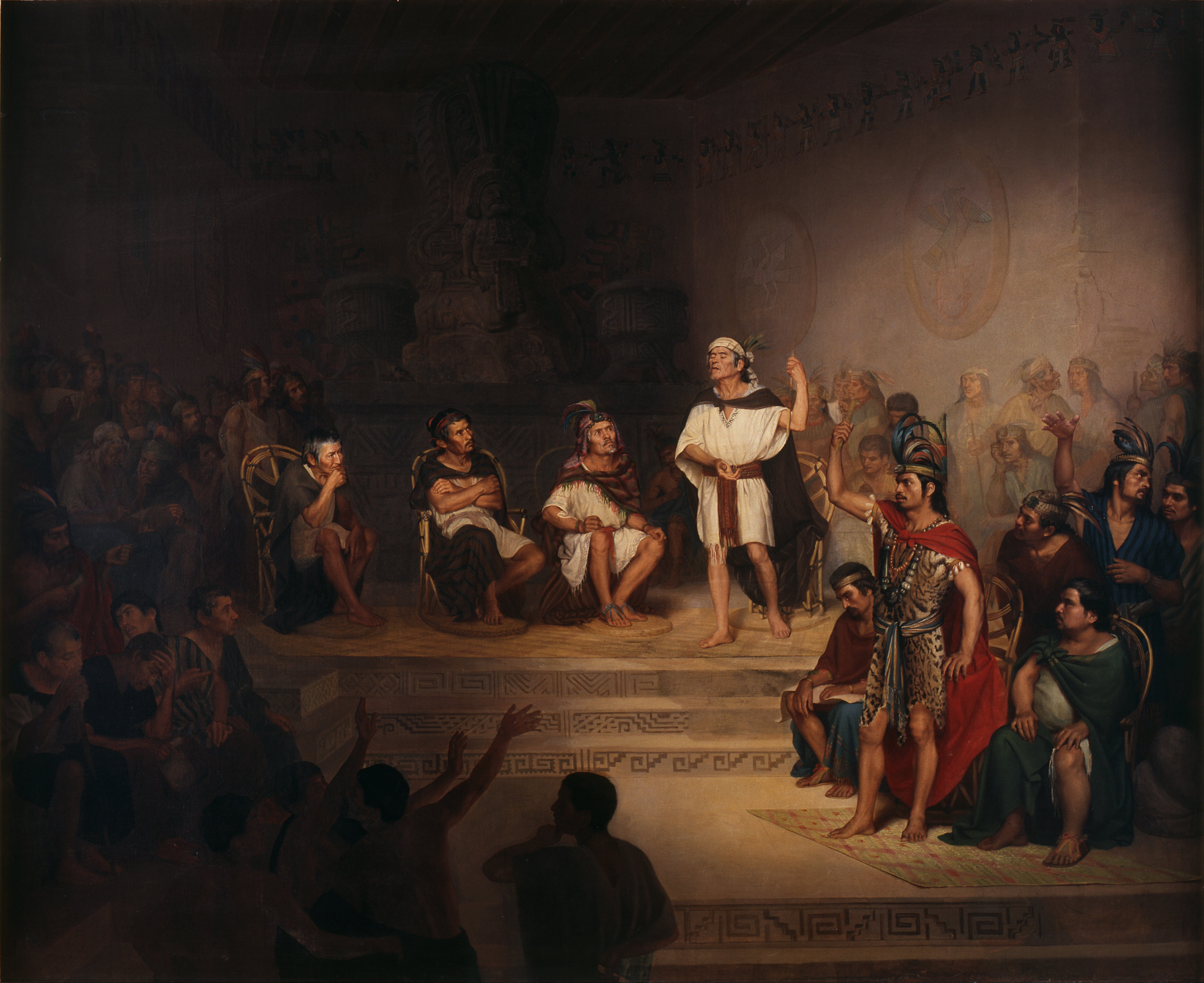
"The Tlaxcallan Senate", depiction of the Tlaxcalan government by Rodrigo Gutiérrez, 1875

Following the Spanish Conquest, Tlaxcala was divided into four fiefdoms (señoríos) by the Spanish corregidor Gómez de Santillán in 1545 (26 years after the Conquest). These fiefdoms were Ocotelolco, Quiahuiztlan, Tepeticpac, and Tizatlan. At this time, four great houses or lineages emerged and claimed hereditary rights to each fiefdom and created fictitious genealogies extending back into the pre-Columbian era to justify their claims.

During the colonial period, Tlaxcala's "part in the conquest of the Aztec 'empire,' its favored treatment by the Spanish crown, unique talent for propaganda and litigation and astonishing enterprise" gave the small state an important place in Mexican history.

In the 16th and 17th centuries, Tlaxcalan settlers went to live in new northern colonies to protect Mexico from the Chichimeca. Tlaxcalan settlers were sent even as far as the Spanish Philippines where they had success, fighting against Buddhist Japanese Pirates (Wokous) and Muslim Malay Jihadis (Juramentados).

== See also ==
- Tlaxcaltec – Nahua ethnic group native to Tlaxcala and Puebla
- Tlaxcala – the present day Mexican state
- Tlaxcala, Tlaxcala – the present day capital of the state of Tlaxcala

== Sources ==
- Diego Muñoz Camargo's History of Tlaxcala (Lienzo de Tlaxcala), written in or before 1585, is an illustrated codex describing the conquest of Mexico. It was painted by Tlaxcalteca artists under Spanish supervision.
- Crónica Mexicayotl was written by Fernando Alvarado Tezozomoc, in Nahuatl and Spanish, in the last decades of the 16th century.

== Bibliography ==
- Alvarado Tezozomoc, Fernando (1944). Crónica Mexicana. Mexico: Manuel Orozco y Berra, Leyenda.
- Fargher, Lane F., Richard E. Blanton and Verenice Y. Heredia Espinoza (2010). Egalitarian Ideology and Political Power in Prehispanic Central Mexico: The Case of Tlaxcallan. "Latin American Antiquity," 21(3):227–251.
- Gibson, Charles (1952). Tlaxcala in the Sixteenth Century. New Haven: Yale University Press.
- Hassig, Ross (2001). "Xicotencatl: rethinking an indigenous Mexican hero", Estudios de Cultura Nahuatl, UNAM.
- Hicks, Frederic (2009). Land and Succession in the Indigenous Noble Houses of Sixteenth-Century Tlaxcala. Ethnohistory, 56:4, 569–588.
- Muñoz Camargo, Diego (1982) [1892]. Historia de Tlaxcala. Alfredo Chavero. México.
- Restall, Matthew; Florine Asselbergs (2007). Invading Guatemala: Spanish, Nahua, and Maya Accounts of the Conquest Wars. University Park, Pennsylvania, USA: Pennsylvania State University Press. ISBN 978-0-271-02758-6. OCLC 165478850.
- Our lady of assumption ex convent. Bienvenidos al INAH. (n.d.). Retrieved November 30, 2021, from https://www.inah.gob.mx/en/english/4181-our-lady-of-assumption-ex-convent.
