= Tepeticpac =

Archaeological site in Tlaxcala, Mexico

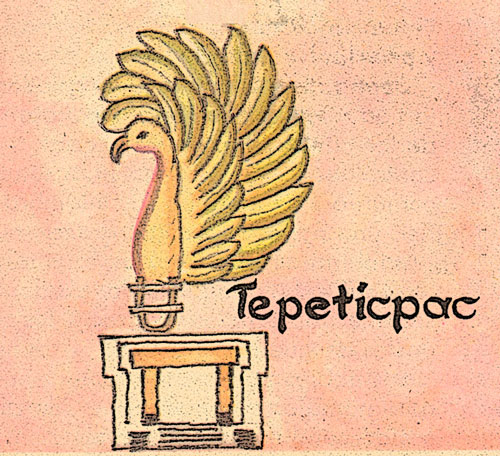
- Hieroglyph of Tepeticpac.
- Interactive map of Tepeticpac
- Type: Archaeological site
- Cultures: Tollan Tlaxkallan
- Location: Santiago Tepeticpac, Totolac, Tlaxcala, Mexico
- Region: Puebla–Tlaxcala Valley

Site notes
- Management: National Institute of Anthropology and History (INAH)
- Public access: Open

Tepeticpac is an archaeological site located in the village of Santiago Tepeticpac, in the municipality of Totolac, Tlaxcala, in Mexico. It sits atop the hills of Cuauhtzi, El Fuerte, and Tlaxistlan, at over 2,450 m (8,040 ft) above sea level, and covers approximately 98 hectares within the Puebla-Tlaxcala Valley. It was part of the ancient huey altépetl (señorío) of Tlaxcallan, along with Ocotelolco, Tizatlan, and Quiahuiztlan. This polity was made up of several interconnected settlements in the central region of the Mexican Plateau.

Two main phases of occupation have been identified through archaeological research: an Epiclassic phase from 600 to 900 AD, followed by a period of abandonment, and a Late Postclassic phase from approximately 1200 to 1519 AD. Between 20 and 25 types of polychrome wares have been documented through ceramic studies, with at least 169 terraces, six plazas, and ten temple structures identified through topographic surveys and distributed across five distinct sectors.

As one of the four founding altepemeh of the Tlaxcallan Confederation, Tepeticpac served religious and defensive purposes. Some of the remains found include perimeter walls, watchtowers up to seven meters tall, and complex terracing systems adapted to the local topography. Ceramic iconography and altars suggest that Tezcatlipoca was the principal deity, alongside cults to Camaxtli, reflecting the sociopolitical organization of its ruling elite.

Since 2009, the National Institute of Anthropology and History (Instituto Nacional de Antropología e Historia, INAH) has carried out excavations, mapping, and structural consolidation works. Between 2024 and 2025, over 17 million pesos were invested in widening the access road and installing signage. A site museum is planned to open in 2025, which will display various recovered archaeological materials, including the remains of a gomphothere.

== Etymology and symbolism ==
The name Tepeticpac comes from the Nahuatl language and means "at the top of the hill," "above the mountain," or "the summit of the sierra." It is formed from the root "tepetl" (meaning "hill" or "mountain") and the locative suffix "-icpac" (meaning "on top of" or "above"). This toponym reinforced the señorío's identity as an elevated power—a place of authority and refuge overlooking the valley.

As a way of complementing the name of the place, Tepeticpac's warriors were identified on the battlefield by the tlamamalli (military standard) Quaxolot. Historical chronicles describe the figure as a wolf (Xolotl) with a golden head covered in green feathers and yellow ones hanging from its body. This emblem, depicted in codices such as the Lienzo de Tlaxcala, was a symbol of the señorío's martial identity. The wolf, a predator, projected an image of military might and distinguished Tlaxcala's forces from other political entities such as Tizatlán's heron (Aztatzontli) and Ocotelolco's quetzal (Quetzaltototl).

== History ==
=== Pre-Hispanic period ===
==== Foundation ====
The origins of Tepeticpac are linked to the arrival of a group of Teochichimec migrants referred to in sources as Cexcaltecas or Poyauhtecas. According to mythic tradition, these migrants were part of the seven tribes that emerged from Chicomoztoc, or "the place of the seven caves." Led by their patron deity, the hunting god Camaxtli, these groups undertook a migration that brought them to the Puebla-Tlaxcala Valley.

Upon their arrival, the valley was dominated by the Olmeca-Xicallancas, a sedentary and consolidated group that some sources identify with the Popolucas. The encounter between the two peoples was violent. Pictographic sources, such as the Lienzo de Tepeticpac, narrate this conquest visually. In its battle scenes, the Teochichimec warriors are shown with their characteristic weaponry: the bow (tlahuitolli) and arrow (mitl), arms that gave them a tactical advantage over local warriors, who fought with the obsidian club (macuahuitl) and the shield (chimalli). This conflict culminated in the expulsion of the Olmeca-Xicallancas and the establishment of Teochichimec dominance in the region.

The Teochichimec conquerors were led by Culhuatecuhtli Quanex, who is recognized in the chronicles as the founder of Tepeticpac and the first ruler of the new political entity. Culhuatecuhtli Quanex chose the hilltops of Tepeticpac as the site for its capital, a natural fortress from which to exercise control and defend the territory. As supreme lord, Culhuatecuhtli Quanex was responsible for governance and the administration of justice. In an act of political expansion and consolidation, Culhuatecuhtli Quanex ceded part of the conquered territory to his brother, Teyohualminqui, who founded the second of the great señoríos, Ocotelolco, in the lowlands of the valley.

The precise chronology of these founding events is a matter of debate among historians, as the colonial sources present conflicting dates.

Proposed dates for the foundation of Tepeticpac
Proposed date	Source/Proponent	Context/Notes	Ref.
c. 1260–1280 AD	Diego Muñoz Camargo	States that the arrival took place in the year 5 Técpatl (5 Flint), 300 years before his History of Tlaxcala was written.	
c. 1310 AD	Gámez (citing sources)	When the Teochichimecas are said to have driven out the Popolucas (Olmeca-Xicallancas).	
1331 AD	Zapata y Mendoza	Specially mentions the year 9 Técpatl as the date of the Teochichimeca people's arrival.	
1348–1371 AD	Daniel Alatorre Reyes (UNAM)	Proposed period for the foundation of the four señoríos.	

This process of ethnogenesis through conflict and strategic adaptation is a case study in the formation of Mesoamerican states. The Teochichimecs employed a combination of military technology (the bow and arrow) and a strategy of geographic positioning (the hilltop fortress) to establish a new polity. The subsequent founding of Ocotelolco by Quanex's brother was a strategy of fission and expansion. This model allowed the original group to colonize and control the surrounding valley, granting domains to key leaders to prevent internal power struggles while maintaining a unified front against external threats. The fortress of Tepeticpac provided the security necessary for this colonización project to develop, laying the foundations of the Tlaxcallan confederation.

==== Political and military organization ====
Tepeticpac's primary function was as a military stronghold. Its strategic hilltop location, flanked by deep ravines, was reinforced by a network of defensive elements, including walls, ditches, narrow passageways, and dry stone structures. These features made Tepeticpac the final refuge for Tlaxcaltecan lords in the event of an invasion.

Tepeticpac was one of the four altepemeh that operated as a collective government, a form of organization that has been anachronistically described as a "republic." This system was distinguished by the absence of an absolute monarch, such as the huey tlatoani of their Mexica rivals. Instead, the most important decisions, especially those relating to war and foreign policy, were taken by a council or senate composed of the lords (teteuctin) of the four head lands. Although they acted in confederate fashion, each altépetl maintained a high degree of autonomy in its internal affairs, such as the administration of justice and the collection of tribute. Tepeticpac, as the founding señorío, held symbolic pre-eminence and was the custodian of the nation's oldest historical heritage.

=== Conquest Era ===
==== Tlehuexolotzin: Lord of Tepeticpac in 1519 ====
When the Europeans first arrived, the altépetl of Tepeticpac was ruled by the tlatoani Tlehuexolotzin, who had come to power around 1510. As one of the four principal lords of the Tlaxcaltecan senate, his voice was crucial in the debates that arose as Cortés's forces advanced. According to sources, Tlehuexolotzin participated in deliberations with Maxixcatl of Ocotelolco, Xicoténcatl the Elder of Tizatlán, and Citlalpopocatzin of Quiahuiztlán to decide on a course of action.

After the alliance was formed, Tlehuexolotzin committed his warriors to support the Spanish military campaigns, as did the other lords. Though details of his involvement are scarce, it is known that his señorío contributed a contingent to the Tlaxcaltecan forces, who became the Spanish's most important allies in the conquest of the Aztec Empire.

The colonial record presents inconsistencies regarding the Christian name of Tlehuexolotzin, reflecting the era's often contradictory historical narratives. Assigning Christian names to Tlaxcaltecan lords was a symbolic act, and variations in the sources may indicate disputes over prestige among the lineages of the different headlands during the viceregal period. The following comparative table illustrates these discrepancies:

Lords and military standards of the four Tlaxcaltecan señoríos
Altépetl	Lord (Nahuatl name)	Military standard (Tlamamalli)	Christian name(s) and discrepancies in the sources	Ref.
Tepeticpac	Tlehuexolotzin	Quaxolotl (Wolf with golden head and feathers)	Vicente. Other sources omit him or suggest his successor was called Gonzalo.	
Tizatlán	Huehue Xicoténcatl	Aztatzontli (White heron with golden and green feathers)	Vicente or Lorenzo (according to Bernal Díaz).	
Ocotelolco	Maxixcatzin	Quetzaltototl (Quetzal bird with golden beak and feet)	Lorenzo	
Quiahuiztlán	Citlalpopocatzin	Quetzalpatzactli (Wing of green feathers with gold)	Bartolomé	

==== Early Christianization and cultural change ====
The baptism of the Four Lords was a foundational act of the new colonial order. It was a symbolic event that solidified the military and spiritual alliance with Spain. Historical documents from Tlaxcala, such as the Lienzo de Tlaxcala, depict this episode as a way to remind the Spanish Crown of their early and voluntary conversion to Christianity. This was a key argument in defense of their privileges.

The new faith took shape in Tepeticpac with the construction of one of the region's first Christian chapels, which was erected at the summit of Cerro El Fuerte, the symbolic center of the señorío. However, the fate of this chapel illustrates the tensions of the evangelization process. A powerful storm destroyed it in 1552. The following year, in 1553, it was completely demolished and never rebuilt.

This abandonment must be considered within the context of the political and religious climate of the time. The chapel was destroyed a few years after a period of religious persecution around 1545, during which several Tlaxcaltecan nobles were tried and executed for idolatry. Among them was Don Francisco Tecpanécatl, a lord of Tepeticpac. This event, which the indigenous chronicler Zapata y Mendoza described as a time of terror that drove mass conversions out of fear, affected the prestige of Tepeticpac.

The non-reconstruction of the Chapel of Tepeticpac has been seen by the scholars as a symptom of its political decline in the new colonial configuration. The event reflected a confluence of factors, including the loss of prestige of the Tepeticpac lineage due to persecution, the diminishing of its strategic importance in a pacified landscape, and the Spanish colonial project of centralizing power, which entailed the construction of a new capital city, Tlaxcala, complete with a central plaza, cathedral, and government buildings. This shifted the political and economic center of gravity away from ancient pre-Hispanic head towns, rendering the mountain chapel-fortress obsolete.

=== Post-colonial era ===
Once the conquest was consolidated, the roles of Tepeticpac and Tlaxcala changed. Their military tradition, developed during their resistance to the Mexica and their alliance with the Spanish, was redirected by the Crown to advance its interests in expanding New Spain's northern frontier.

One of the most significant episodes in post-conquest Tlaxcaltecan history took place in 1591: the migration of 400 families to colonize and pacify the Gran Chichimeca region. This agreement, negotiated with Viceroy Luis de Velasco II, served two purposes: establishing sedentary settlements to set an example for local nomadic groups and creating a loyal colonial barrier to protect the silver routes connecting the northern mines with the viceregal center.

In exchange for their services, the Tlaxcaltecan colonists were granted privileges that were codified in formal capitulations. These included perpetual hidalguía (minor noble status) for themselves and their descendants; exemption from tribute and personal service; the grant of freehold land; and the right to bear arms and ride horses—prerogatives normally reserved for Spaniards.

Each of the four great señoríos of Tlaxcala provided a group of people for this colonization effort. The señorío of Tepeticpac organized a caravan of 228 people, under the command of captains Francisco Vázquez and Joaquín Paredes. This group departed from Tlaxcala on June 9, 1591. Their specific destination was the mining region of San Miguel Mexquitic in the Kingdom of Nueva Galicia. This territory that today corresponds to the modern-day state of San Luis Potosí.

In this new land, the colonists from Tepeticpac and the other head towns replicated their social structures and agricultural knowledge, while also founding new settlements. In San Luis Potosí, the Tlaxcaltecan families established the village of La Asunción Tlaxcalilla. Over time, this settlement was absorbed into the growing city of San Luis Potosí, becoming the present-day Barrio de Tlaxcala, a community that still preserves its Tlaxcaltecan identity and heritage.

Tepeticpac's participation in this diaspora represented a strategic shift in its history. Having lost its primary defensive function in a pacified highland, the region's human capital and military tradition were repurposed by the empire. The families who marched north were soldier-settlers—agents of acculturation and defenders of a new frontier. Through this process, they transitioned from defending their altépetl to becoming co-conquerors and founders of New Spain, exporting their culture and legacy across the continent.

== Archaeological site ==
=== Description and topography ===
The Tepeticpac archaeological site is located approximately five kilometers north of the modern city of Tlaxcala. It spreads across a series of difficult-to-access hills: Cuauhtzi, Tenextepetl, Coyotepetl, and El Fuerte. Its altitude ranges from 7,710 ft (2,350 m) to 8,330 ft (2,540 m) above sea level, towering over the surrounding valley.

The site's architecture reflects its military function. It is known for its extensive defensive structures, including walls, ditches, restricted corridors, and dry stone albarradas. The most notable defensive feature is the so-called Gran Zanja, a ditch more than 350 meters long designed to block access to the center of the settlement from the north.

The urban layout adapted to the rugged terrain through the construction of numerous artificial terraces. The architectural style is characterized by large, open plazas flanked by low platforms and buildings, rather than the large-scale pyramids that dominated the ceremonial centers of rivals such as Tenochtitlan and Cholula. Archaeologists have posited that the absence of a central, monumental structure reflects Tlaxcallan's collective form of government, which did not exalt a single ruler.

=== Research and conservation ===
Since 2010, the Tepeticpac Archaeological Project (Proyecto Arqueológico Tepeticpac, PAT) has carried out continuous scientific research under the direction of the National Institute of Anthropology and History (INAH). The PAT's objectives are to reconstruct the sociopolitical structure of the señorío, understand its development over time, and analyze its role in the Puebla-Tlaxcala region.

In recent years, the site has received investment and attention from federal and state authorities. The most recent developments, beginning in 2024, include:

- Protective Perimeter: An official "protective polygon" was established to delimit and safeguard a 98-hectare area of the archaeological core.
- Infrastructure Improvements: In July 2024, the INAH and the government of the state of Tlaxcala inaugurated the widening and paving of the access road to the site in order to improve accessibility.
- New Site Museum: Construction of the new museum was officially announced in 2024, with work starting in early 2026. The museum will display excavation finds, including the remains of a gomphothere discovered in 2014, as well as artefacts illustrating the site's history. The aim is to promote the heritage of Tepeticpac and establish the site as a cultural and educational destination.
