= Tlaxcaltec =

Indigenous people of Mexico

Tlaxkaltekatl
Tlaxcaltecatl (singular) Tlaxcalteca (plural)
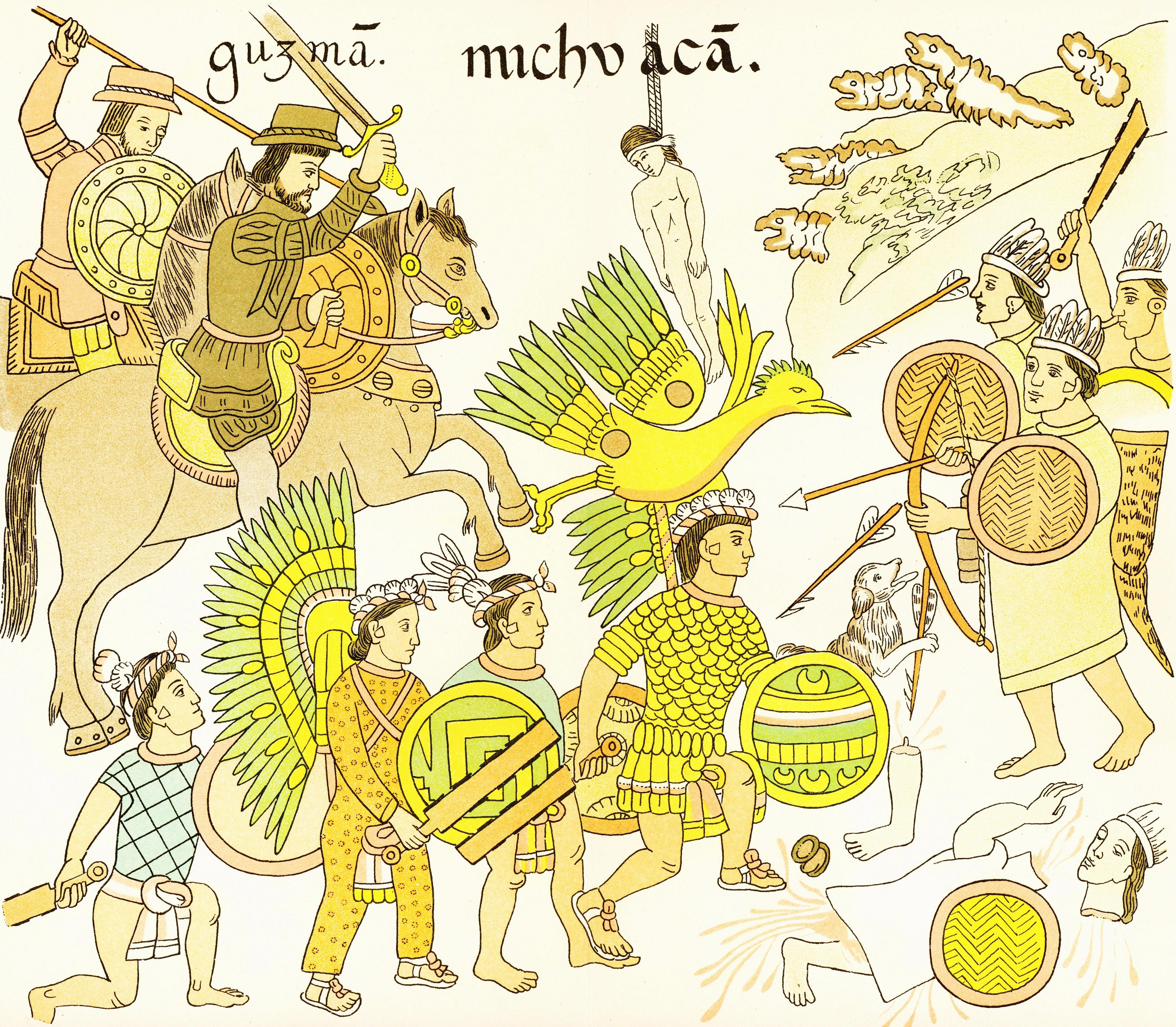
- Tlaxcaltec and Spanish warriors fighting against Purépecha warriors.

Total population
- 266,662

Regions with significant populations
- Region of Matlalcueye, Tlaxcala–Puebla Valley, Tlaxcala; locations in the Bajío and Northeast Mexico; Tlaxcala, Coahuila, Nuevo León, Jalisco, Guatemala

Languages
- Nahuatl (Tlaxcala dialect), Spanish, Otomi

Religion
- Polytheism; Catholicism

Related ethnic groups
- Nahuas

The Tlaxcaltecs (sometimes Tlaxcallans), or Tlaxcalteca, are a Nahua people that formed in the Puebla–Tlaxcala Valley, in the present-day territory of Mexico, during the postclassic period in Mesoamerica (c. 1200–1521 AD). One of their most distinctive characteristics was their government, which set them apart from many of their contemporaries including their Mexica rivals because theocratic monarchies were more common in the region. The Tlaxcaltecs established a confederation called Tlaxcallan made up of four altepetl called Tepeticpac, Ocotelulco, Tizatlán, and Quiahuiztlán. The Confederacy was composed of a council leading to it sometimes being called a "republic" by scholars.

== History ==
The historical trajectory of the Tlaxcaltec people is marked by two fundamental events that defined their fate and that of the entire region. The first was their nearly century-long resistance against the expansionism of the Mexica Empire, which allowed them to preserve their independence despite being completely surrounded by hostile territories. The second was the forging of a strategic alliance with the Spanish expedition led by Hernán Cortés in 1519. This decision, driven by their deep enmity with Tenochtitlan, made the Tlaxcaltecs the most numerous and decisive indigenous allies of the conquistadors, which proved crucial in the fall of the Mexica Empire and in the subsequent campaigns of expansion of the Spanish Empire.

As a result of this alliance, the Spanish Crown granted Tlaxcala a privileged status, unique in the Viceroyalty of New Spain, which included notable political autonomy, tax exemptions, and recognition of their nobility. The Tlaxcaltecs defended this status throughout the viceregal period and across all their territories, thereby ensuring the preservation of their identity and their land.

Nevertheless, this same legacy has generated a complex and often contested historical memory. While from an internal perspective they are seen as co-founders of colonial and modern Mexico, in the national narrative that emerged after Independence — oriented toward building a centralist and homogeneous official history — they have frequently been stigmatised as "traitors" to the indigenous cause. Analysis of their history as an indigenous people therefore reflects the complexity of indigenous alliances and political decisions in the context of the conquest and the formation of the colonial order.

=== Origin and ethnogenesis ===
==== Ethnogenesis and migration ====
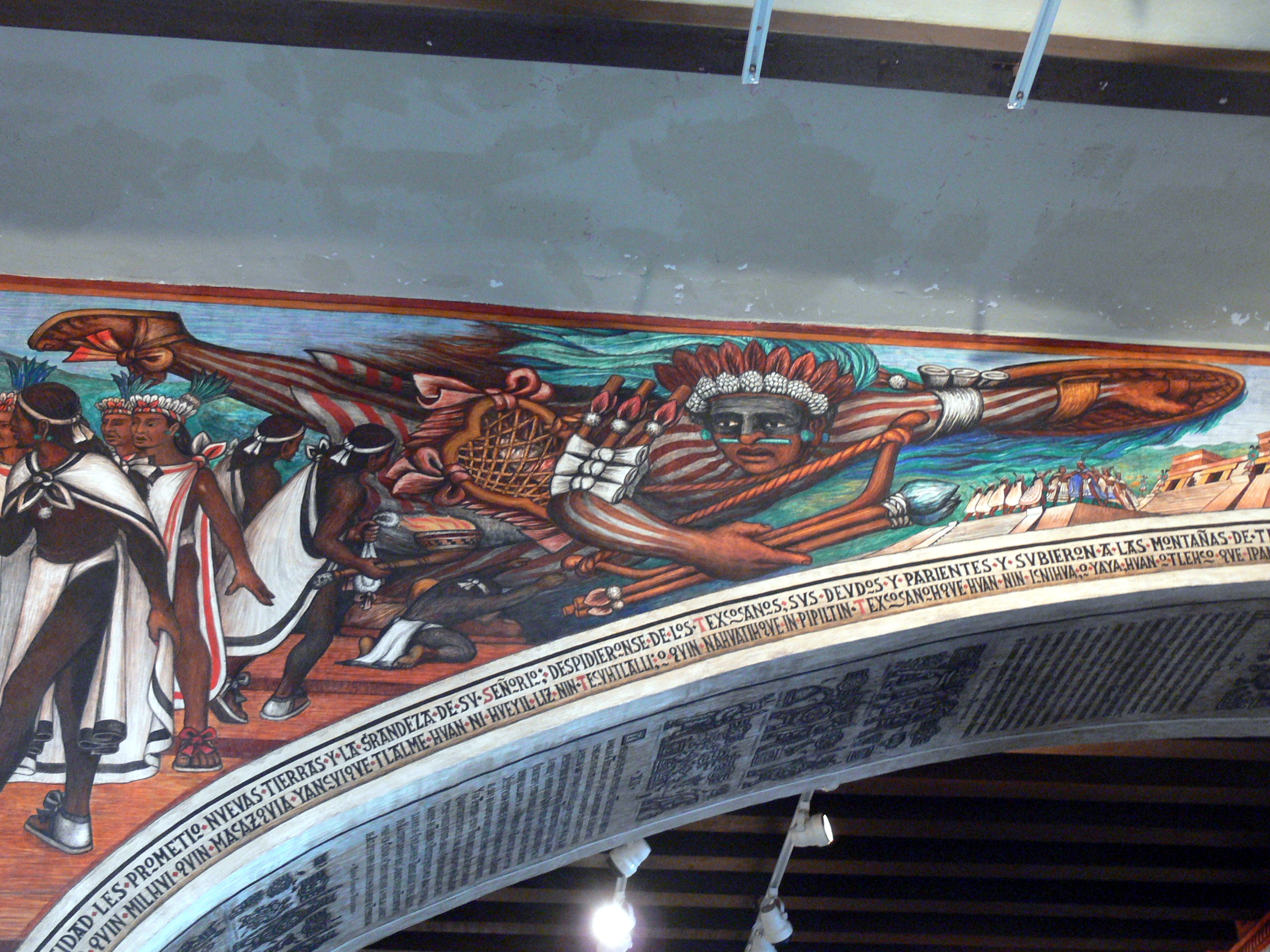
Camaxtli guiding his people to the promised land, detail from the murals of the Tlaxcala Government Palace.

The chronicles place the origin of the Tlaxcaltec people as part of the teochichimecs, one of the seven Nahuatlaca lineages who, according to tradition, emerged from Chicomoztoc, a mythical place meaning "the place of the seven caves". Their ethnogenesis is framed within a complex process of migration that took them from the north toward the central highlands.

Around the year 1290 AD, this group arrived in the Valley of Mexico and founded a settlement called Poyauhtlan, on the shores of Lake Texcoco. However, their stay in this region was brief: because they led an existence described as "primitive" and lived in caves, they soon came into conflict with other, more established groups, who forced them to abandon the valley. The Tlaxcalteca were a Nahua group, one of—alongside the Mexica and five others—the seven tribes which migrated from their original homeland in the north. After settling in (what is now called) Tlaxcala, they formed a conglomeration of three distinct ethnic groups—speakers of Nahuatl, Otomi, and Pinome—that comprised the four city-states (altepetl) of Tlaxcallān, or Tlaxcala. The Nahuatl-speakers eventually became the dominant ethnic group; and, though the four cities were supposed to have had equal status within the confederation, the city of Tizatlan was effectively controlling Tlaxcala by the time of European contact.

This forced exile marked the beginning of a long pilgrimage that took them across the slopes of the volcanoes Popocatépetl and Iztaccíhuatl and near Huejotzingo. Eventually, their journey led them to the region that today forms the state of Tlaxcala. Upon arriving, they found the territory occupied by the Olmec-Xicallanca, from whom they requested permission to settle; it was the Olmec-Xicallanca themselves who granted them lands near a hill called Cuatlapanga, where they established their first settlement.

==== Foundation of Tepeticpac and the confederation ====
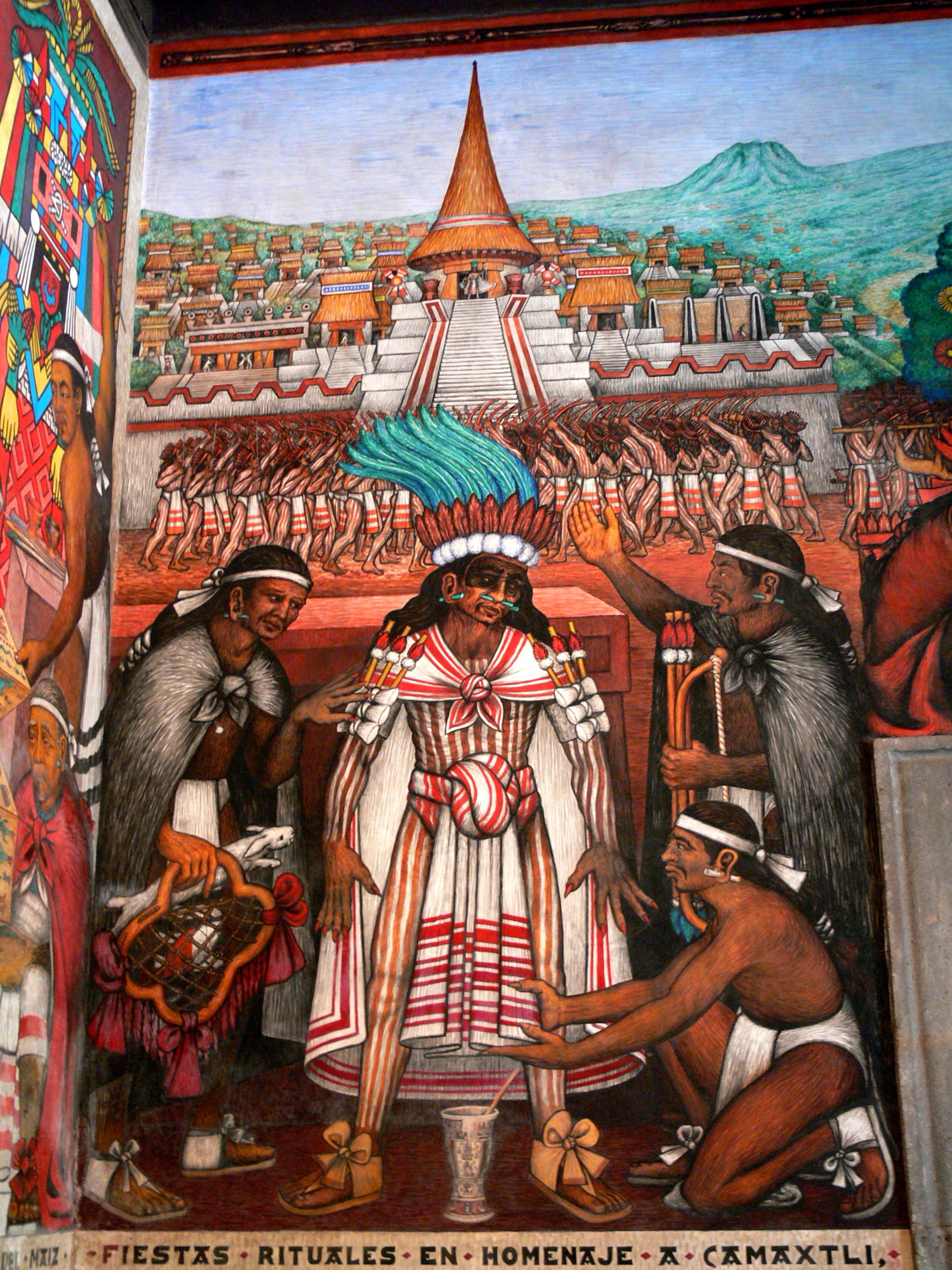
The tutelary deity of the Tlaxcaltec people, Camaxtli, in the murals of the Tlaxcala Government Palace, painted by Desiderio Hernández Xochitiotzin.

The move to the hill of Tepeticpac, whose name in Nahuatl means "above the hill," was a key step in the consolidation of the Tlaxcaltec community. This movement entailed not only a geographical change but also the establishment of a new centre of power. Guided by their tutelary deity Camaxtli, and under the leadership of their chieftain Culhuatecuhtli, the teochichimec-Tlaxcaltecs managed to expel from the region the remnants of the Olmec-Xicallanca and Toltec peoples, enabling them to establish the first Tlaxcaltec lordship.

With this military victory, they established themselves as the new lords of the territory and founded the first and oldest of the four lordships: Tepeticpac. Over time, the region as a whole adopted the name Tlaxcallan, translated as "place of maize bread" or "place of tortillas"; however, this denomination has been contested on the grounds that it may be a phonetic corruption, and the name could have been Texcallac, as Diego Muñoz Camargo asserted, meaning "precipice".

From this original nucleus at Tepeticpac, the Tlaxcaltec nation began to expand, resulting in the formation of the other three lordships that would make up the confederation. This process, which took place approximately between 1348 and 1384, was not the result of a casual alliance but of the division of the original group, which contributed to the consolidation of a unified political body.

- Ocotelulco (c. 1348): Culhuatecuhtli ceded part of the territory to his younger brother, Teyohualminqui, who founded the second lordship. Ocotelulco (Note: In Nahuatl, "in the place where there are small ocote balls.") grew rapidly to become the most important commercial centre and the most populous lordship in the confederation.
- Tizatlán (c. 1365): Its origin is linked to a conflict with the lordship of Cholula. After a Cholultec attack that resulted in the death of the lord of Ocotelulco, a group of refugees fled and founded Tizatlán. (Note: In Nahuatl, "place between chalk or sandy white earth.") Over time, this settlement became a politically and religiously important centre, rivalling the other lordships in prosperity.
- Quiahuiztlán (c. 1384): The fourth lordship (Note: In Nahuatl, "place of rain.") was founded by a group of teochichimecs who arrived in the valley and to whom Culhuatecuhtli had promised lands. This lordship stood out as a centre of artisanal production.

This process of consolidation is set within a broader archaeological context in the Puebla–Tlaxcala Valley, which shows a long history of occupation. The region progressed from scattered agricultural villages during the Tzompantepec (1600–1200 BC) and Tlatempa (1200–800 BC) phases, to more complex ceremonial and urban centres in the Texoloc (800–300 BC) and Tezoquipan (400–100 BC) phases, laying the groundwork for the rise of a powerful political entity such as the one the Spanish encountered.

=== Tlaxcaltec political system ===
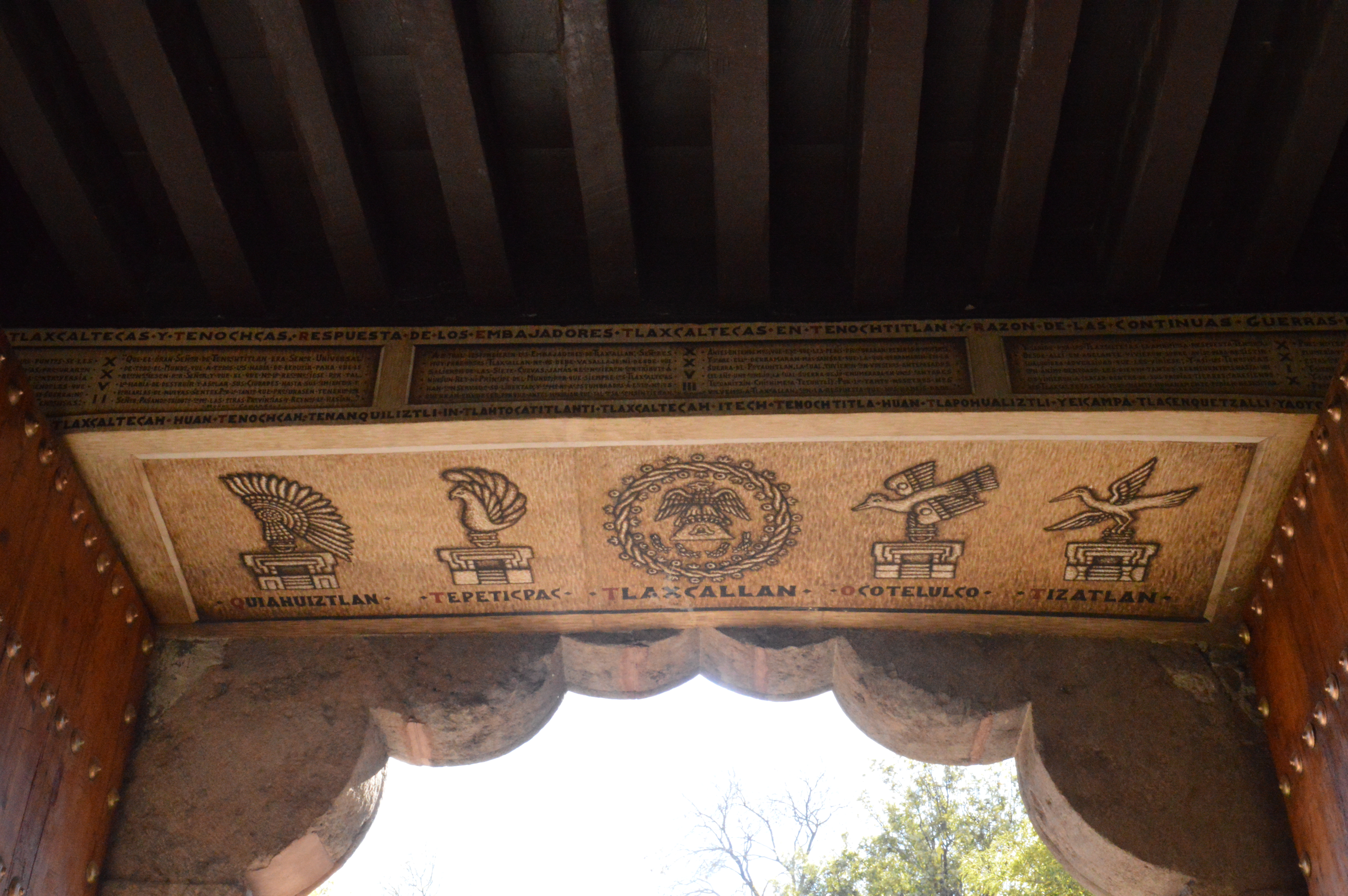
Emblems and names of the Four Lordships, with the detail of "Tlaxcallan" in the centre.

The most distinctive characteristic of Tlaxcallan was its system of government, a political structure that modern scholarship describes as an "indigenous republic" or collective government (Tlaxkallan Altepeyotl in Nahuatl). This model represented a marked departure from the Mesoamerican norm, which tended toward centralised and hereditary monarchies such as that of the Mexica Empire. The fundamental principle of the Tlaxcaltec system was the shared power among multiple noble houses (tekkalli) and the absence of a single supreme ruler or huey tlatoani.

The geopolitics of the region, marked by a state of perpetual war with an expansionist imperial enemy, appears to have been the catalyst for the development of this form of government. A monarchical system could be more vulnerable, since the death or capture of a king can destabilise the entire state. In contrast, a collective government like that of Tlaxcala, with a council and rotating military leadership, allowed for greater continuity and flexibility in political management, which was key to facing various threats.

In the Meso-American world, society was organized around the altepetl, of which the Tlaxcalteca were one of the largest. Because the Aztec Empire did not integrate conquered people, but allowed them to retain their former governing apparatus so long as they paid tribute, the Tlaxcalteca were actively involved with the politics of their neighbors. Tlaxcala would often support regime-change in, and form alliances with, city-states which were nominally under the control of the Mexica. Despite paying tribute to the Mexica, the local rivalries of regional powers would often flare up and enable the Tlaxcalteca to intervene in nearby polities. One such example is the Tlaxcalan attack on the city of Cholula with Spanish allies, due to a rivalry between the two that predated the arrival of Europeans.

==== Confederation of the four lordships ====
"The order [...] that its people have of governing themselves is almost like the lordships of Venice and Genoa or Pisa, for there is no universal lord over all. There are many lords, and all reside in this city, and the country's peoples are farmers who are subjects of these lords, and each has his own land..."

— Hernán Cortés, Second Letter of Relation

The political structure of Tlaxcallan was based on a confederation of its four main towns: Tepeticpac, Ocotelulco, Tizatlán, and Quiahuiztlán. Each of these altepetl enjoyed autonomy in managing its internal affairs, but they acted in a unified manner on matters of state, especially in foreign policy, diplomacy, and war. More than a simple alliance, the confederation was a political body with a clear functional specialisation among its members:

- Tepeticpac: As the original lordship, located in an elevated and fortified position, it functioned as the primary military stronghold and specialised in defence and foreign affairs.
- Ocotelulco: It was the lordship with the greatest economic power in the confederation, as it housed the great market (tianguis), the largest and busiest, and was also the most populous lordship.
- Tizatlán: It consolidated as the political and religious heart of Tlaxcallan, as it housed important temples and the palaces where councils met to deliberate on matters of war and government.
- Quiahuiztlán: It stood out as an important centre for artisans and their production.

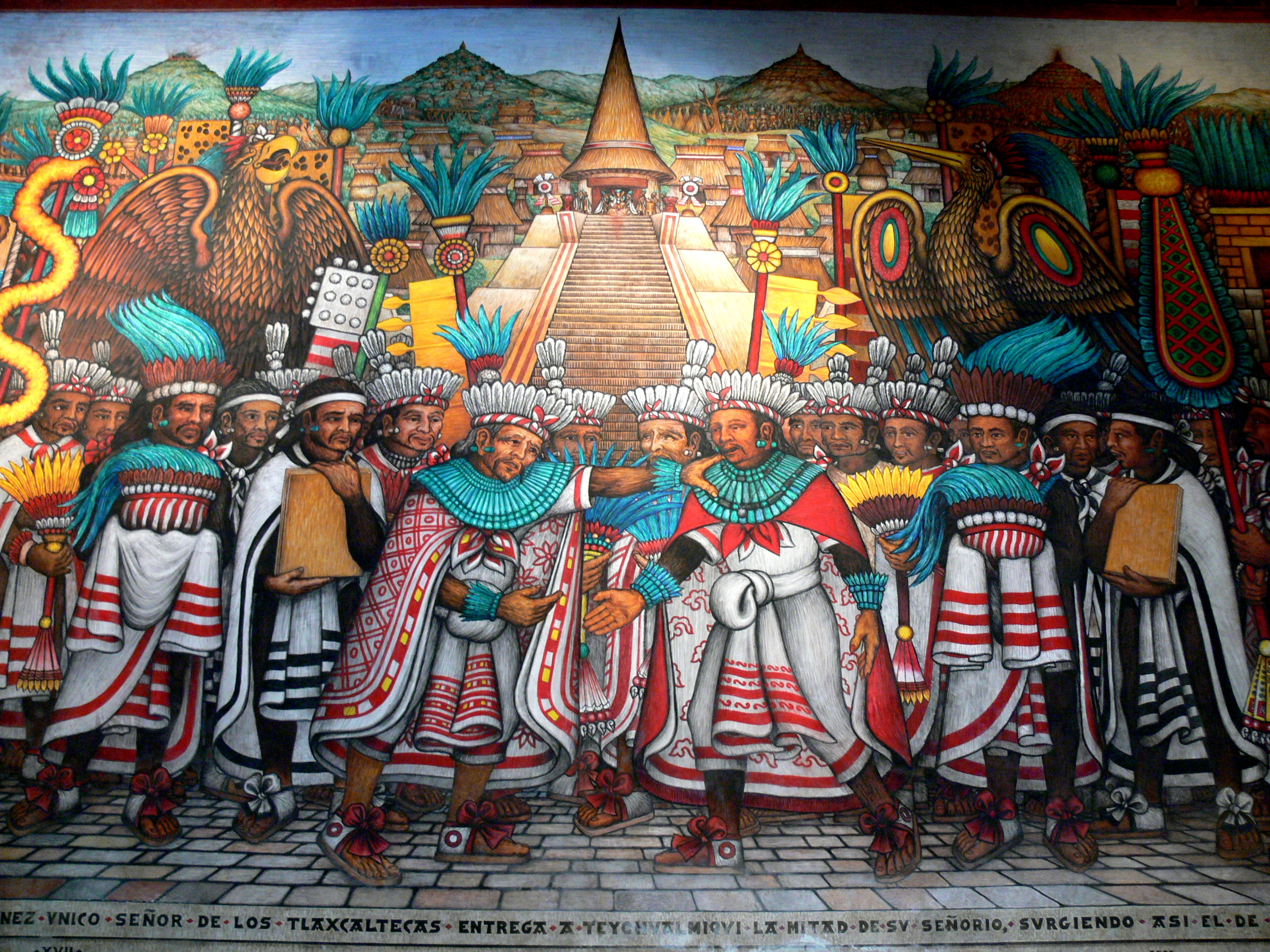
The lordships in discussion, detail from the murals of the Tlaxcala Government Palace.

==== Structure of government ====
Rather than residing in a single individual, power in Tlaxcallan rested in a series of councils and collegiate institutions.

- Council of the Four Lords (Nawtetekwtin): This was the supreme governing body, composed of the tekwtli or ruling lord of each of the four main towns. Decisions of greatest consequence — such as declaring war or making peace — required the unanimous consensus of its members. At the time of contact with the Spanish in 1519, this council was made up of Tlahuexolotzin of Tepeticpac, Maxixcatzin of Ocotelulco, Xicohténcatl "the Elder" of Tizatlán, and Citlalpopocatzin of Quiahuiztlán. Sources suggest that this council could have between 50 and 200 members, who advised the main lords and participated in governance decisions.
- Senate (Tlahtoanimeh): In addition to the council of the four lords, there was a broader deliberative body, often referred to as a senate, composed of a large number of nobles and officials (tlahtoanimeh). More than equitable, representation in this senate reflected the importance and population of each lordship: Ocotelulco had 200 senators, Tizatlán 150, Quiahuiztlán 100, and Tepeticpac 50.

==== Meritocratic leadership and social stratification ====
Access to positions of power in Tlaxcallan depended not solely on lineage, but also had a meritocratic component, especially linked to valour and success in war. A common warrior (macehualli) could rise to the noble class (pilli) and eventually aspire to a position in government through military feats. This system fostered military excellence in society and resulted in the creation of a broad warrior class, essential for the defence of the state.

Sources describe a public initiation ritual for those who aspired to become members of the senate. Candidates, after proving their worth as soldiers, had to present themselves naked in a public square, where the crowd insulted and struck them. This test of endurance and humility served to filter individuals whose loyalty lay with the common good and the state rather than with personal pride, promoting a civic ideology tied to community and order.

Tlaxcaltec society was stratified but allowed for considerable social mobility. At the apex were the tetekwtin (the four ruling lords) and the tlahtoanimeh (senators and lesser nobles). Below them came the pipiltin (the nobility in general), the pochteca (long-distance traders), priests, and various categories of professional warriors and skilled artisans. The base of the social pyramid was made up of the masewaltin (free peasants) and the tlakohtin, a class of non-hereditary servants. The fundamental socioeconomic unit was the tekkalli or noble house, a corporate entity that controlled land and the labour of the commoners attached to it.

==== Archaeological evidence of a collective state ====
Recent archaeological research, led by scholars such as Lane Fargher, has provided physical evidence supporting the model of a collective and decentralised state. The settlement pattern of Tlaxcallan differs radically from monarchical capitals such as Tenochtitlan. Rather than a single monumental ceremonial centre dominated by a great palace and a main temple, Tlaxcallan presented itself as a vast, continuous urban space integrating several smaller centres, reflecting its polycentric political structure.

Furthermore, residential architecture shows relatively minor differences in size and luxury between elite and commoner dwellings. This suggests an egalitarian ideology and an economic policy that prioritised collective well-being, where the state surplus was invested in common goods such as defensive walls rather than in the construction of sumptuous palaces for a single ruler. The physical form of the city reflects the political function of a council-governed state that invested its resources in collective security and infrastructure.

The Four Lordships of Tlaxcallan and their rulers (c. 1519)
Lordship (Main settlement)	Meaning of name in Nahuatl	Main function	Ruling lord	Christian name
Tepeticpac	"Above the hill"	Military stronghold / Foreign affairs	Tlahuexolotzin	Vicente
Ocotelulco	"In the place of small ocote balls"	Economic / Commercial centre	Maxixcatzin	Lorenzo
Tizatlán	"Place of chalk or white earth"	Political / Religious centre	Xicohténcatl "the Elder"	Gonzalo
Quiahuiztlán	"Place of Rain"	Artisanal centre	Citlalpopocatzin	Bartolomé

=== Pre-Hispanic economy ===
The economy of Tlaxcallan, like that of most Mesoamerican societies, rested on a fundamentally agrarian base. Its fields produced the essential crops of the region: maize, beans, squash, tomatoes, and maguey. Maguey was especially versatile and vital, as it yielded aguamiel, a natural sweetener; pulque, a fermented drink of great social and ritual importance; and fibres for making textiles and other household goods. Domestic fauna was limited and consisted mainly of turkeys and a hairless breed of dog, the xoloitzcuintli.

==== Mexica economic blockade ====
For more than sixty years before the arrival of the Spanish, ethnohistorical sources describe the Tlaxcaltec economy as having suffered a trade embargo imposed by the Mexica Triple Alliance, which restricted Tlaxcala's access to goods such as salt, cotton, feathers, cacao, and other luxury products. This economic siege was accompanied by recurring military harassment, which according to the Tlaxcaltec tradition recorded by Muñoz Camargo, entailed a prolonged "siege and war". However, recent archaeological research questions the actual effectiveness of this embargo as a mechanism for completely isolating Tlaxcala: data on obsidian suggest that the Tlaxcaltecs maintained at least partially active regional commercial connections.

==== Adaptations ====
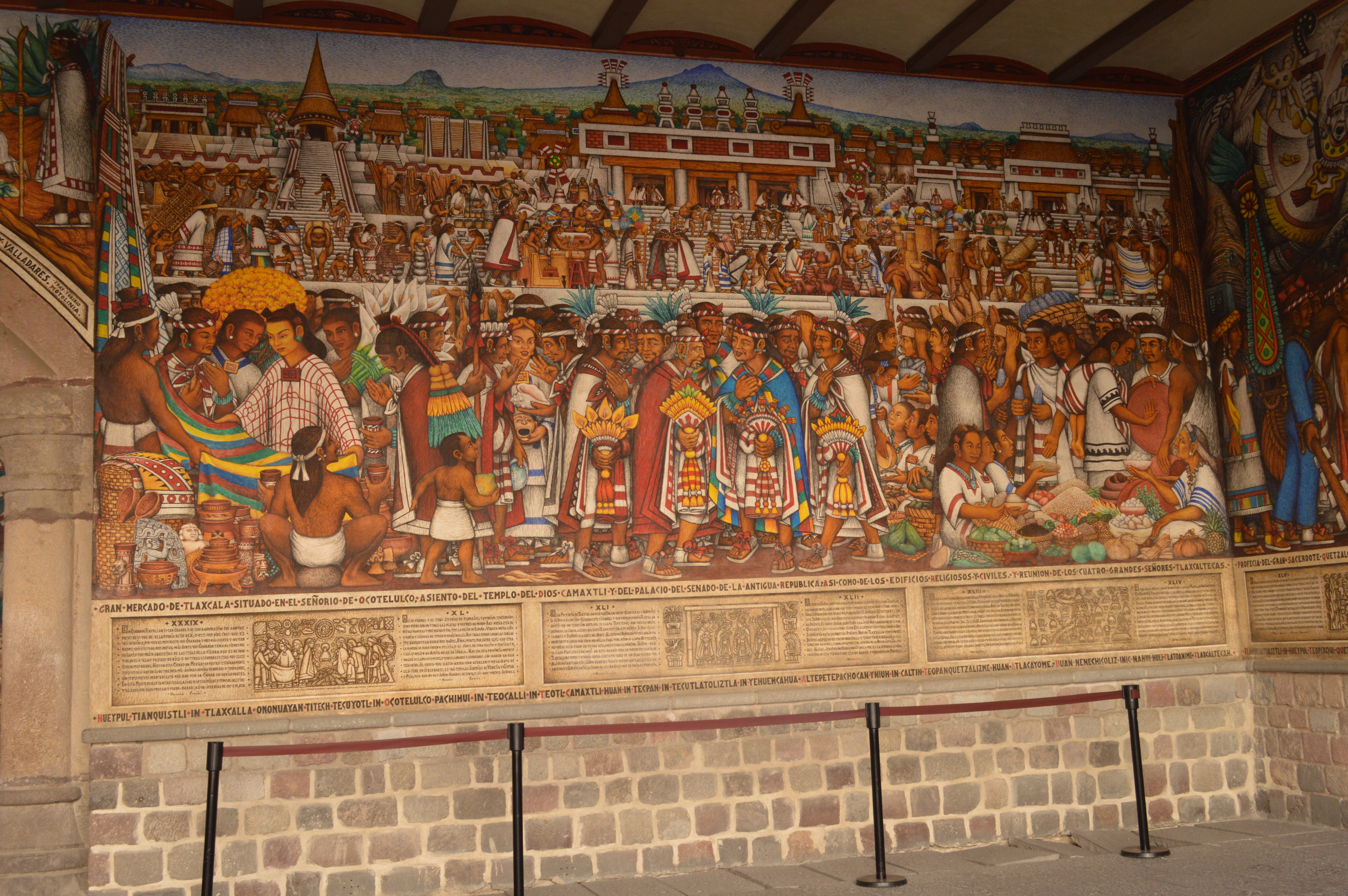
The great Market of Ocotelulco.

During the late Postclassic period, Tlaxcallan society developed an agrarian economy adapted to its environment: the wetlands of the ancient "Ancient Swamp of Tlaxcala" were intensively exploited through hydraulic techniques for large-scale food production. This system — identified in recent studies as "war milpas" — involved the use of waterlogged soils (gleysols, fluvisols) through raised or drained fields, exploiting their natural moisture to grow maize and possibly other grains, with significantly higher yields than rain-fed agriculture. Study calculations show that, if all suitable land had been cultivated, annual maize production could have fed between approximately 250,000 and 388,000 people in the gleysols, suggesting that hydraulic agriculture was a key economic base for Tlaxcallan's institutions.

In parallel, as part of their subsistence strategies, Nahua populations used mineral salts such as tequesquite — a natural salt from lakes or alkaline basins — as an alternative to sea salt. Modern studies demonstrate that tequesquite was an ancestral resource used to season food since pre-Hispanic times. As of 2025, accounts survive of communities that extract tequesquite in the municipalities of El Carmen Tequexquitla and Nopalucan, reinforcing the historical continuity of this practice in areas without access to the coast.

The distinction between state/institutional (wet) agriculture and domestic or rain-fed agriculture, documented for the Postclassic in central Mexico, suggests a socioeconomic order in which certain resources were collectively managed by political groups or local elites. To ensure food security in a limited territory and sustain its formidable military apparatus, the Tlaxcaltecs implemented a sophisticated system of intensive agriculture in the region's wetlands and swamps.

==== Trade and markets ====
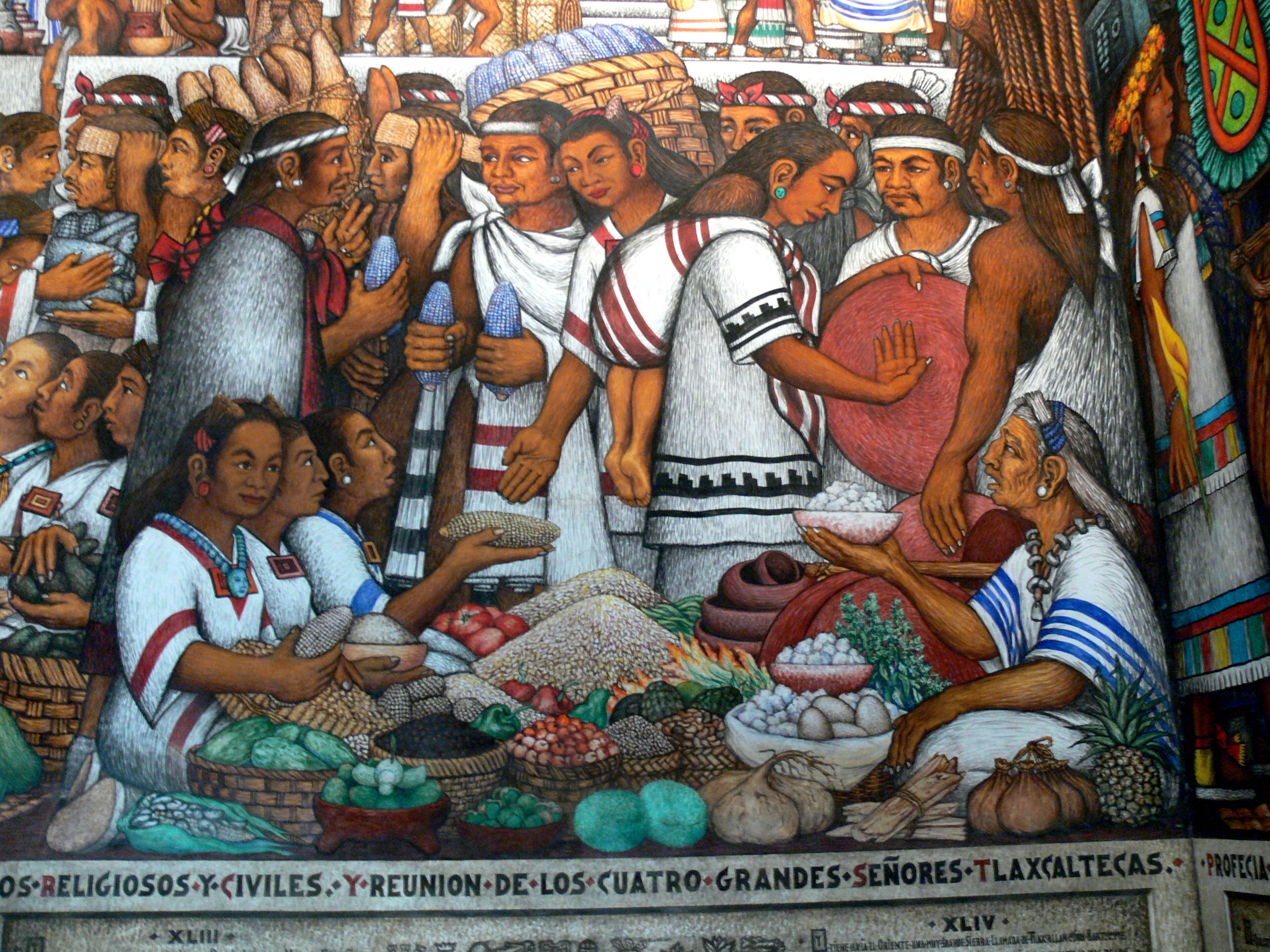
Details of traders at the Ocotelulco market, in the murals of the Tlaxcala Government Palace, painted by Desiderio Hernández Xochitiotzin.

Tlaxcala developed notable commercial activity. The great tianguis of Ocotelulco was the commercial heart of the confederation, an exchange centre that, according to the chronicles, could attract up to 30,000 people daily, with a commercial offering that included clothing, footwear, precious metals, luxury goods, food and medicinal herbs, pottery, barbershops, public baths, among other things. Raw materials such as maize and cochineal were exported, the latter being of high value both in Mesoamerica and in European markets after the conquest. There is evidence that they imported products such as obsidian from distant regions.

The figure of the Tiankistlahtoatsin, or “lord of the market,” in Ocotelulco—associated with the main stately home—demonstrates the importance and organization of trade.

=== Relations with the Mexica Empire ===
The confrontation between Tlaxcallan and the Triple Alliance — led by the Mexica — represented a recurring tension in the Central Highlands during the Late Postclassic. According to some sources, this conflict was not limited to isolated episodes; ethnohistorical chronicles describe a situation of sustained hostility in which the Triple Alliance attempted to undermine the political and economic capacity of Tlaxcallan. Despite this, recent archaeological research questions the idea that Tlaxcallan was completely isolated as a result of external impositions: a study on obsidian trade in the Puebla-Tlaxcala region concludes that exchange patterns with external sources did not vary significantly during the period of Mexica influence — suggesting that, if trade disruption measures existed, their effectiveness was limited. Likewise, the political structure of the Tlaxcaltec people showed particular characteristics: according to one study, this lordship persisted as an autonomous entity even while surrounded by Triple Alliance domains, which raises questions about how effective any attempt at absorption by the Mexica actually was.

Despite early attempts by the Aztecs (more properly: the Mexica), the Tlaxcalteca were never conquered by the Triple Alliance. Later wars between Tlaxcala and the Aztecs were called xochiyaoyatl (flower wars), as their objective was not to conquer but rather to capture enemy warriors for sacrifice. Although they were never made tributaries or subjects of the Mexica, the Tlaxcalteca—surrounded on all sides by Aztec territories—suffered economic as well as military attacks from the same; among the former was an Aztec prohibition on trading salt and other goods with Tlaxcala.

==== Debate on the Flower Wars ====
The historical interpretation of this prolonged conflict presents an academic debate around the concept of the Flower Wars or xochiyaoyotl. Some colonial sources, particularly those with a perspective favourable to the Mexica or Texcocans — such as the writings of Ixtlilxóchitl — describe these wars as ritualised and pre-arranged combats. According to this view, the primary objective was not territorial conquest but the capture of high-ranking prisoners for religious sacrifice, a practice they considered necessary to sustain their deities, such as Huitzilopochtli. This interpretation holds that the Mexica deliberately maintained Tlaxcala as an independent entity, to serve as a reservoir of captives for their rituals.

Against this perspective, another line of interpretation considers that the Flower Wars were genuine armed conflicts of conquest and attrition, in which the ritual component was a cultural feature shared across Mesoamerican warfare and not an exclusive element. Supporters of this view point out that the chronicles detail battles with a high number of casualties and great brutality, which exceeds the framework of limited ritual capture. They also argue that Tlaxcala represented a constant political threat to the Triple Alliance, as it encouraged rebellions in the provinces under Mexica rule. Tlaxcaltec sources, such as those of Muñoz Camargo, make no mention of a ritual warfare pact, but instead emphasise a struggle for survival against Mexica expansionism. The fact that the Mexica subdued other participating lordships such as Huejotzingo and Cholula also challenges the idea of a special exemption for Tlaxcala.

Some authors propose that the persistence of the concept of the Flower Wars as a ritual agreement may have emerged as a post hoc Mexica narrative. According to this hypothesis, the existence of an independent and hostile enclave at the heart of their sphere of influence could be perceived as a military failure for an elite whose identity was grounded in unstoppable expansion. By reframing the conflict as a religious choice, the Mexica elite may have sought to preserve their image of power and to minimise the political agency of Tlaxcala.

==== Military parity and Tlaxcaltec strength ====
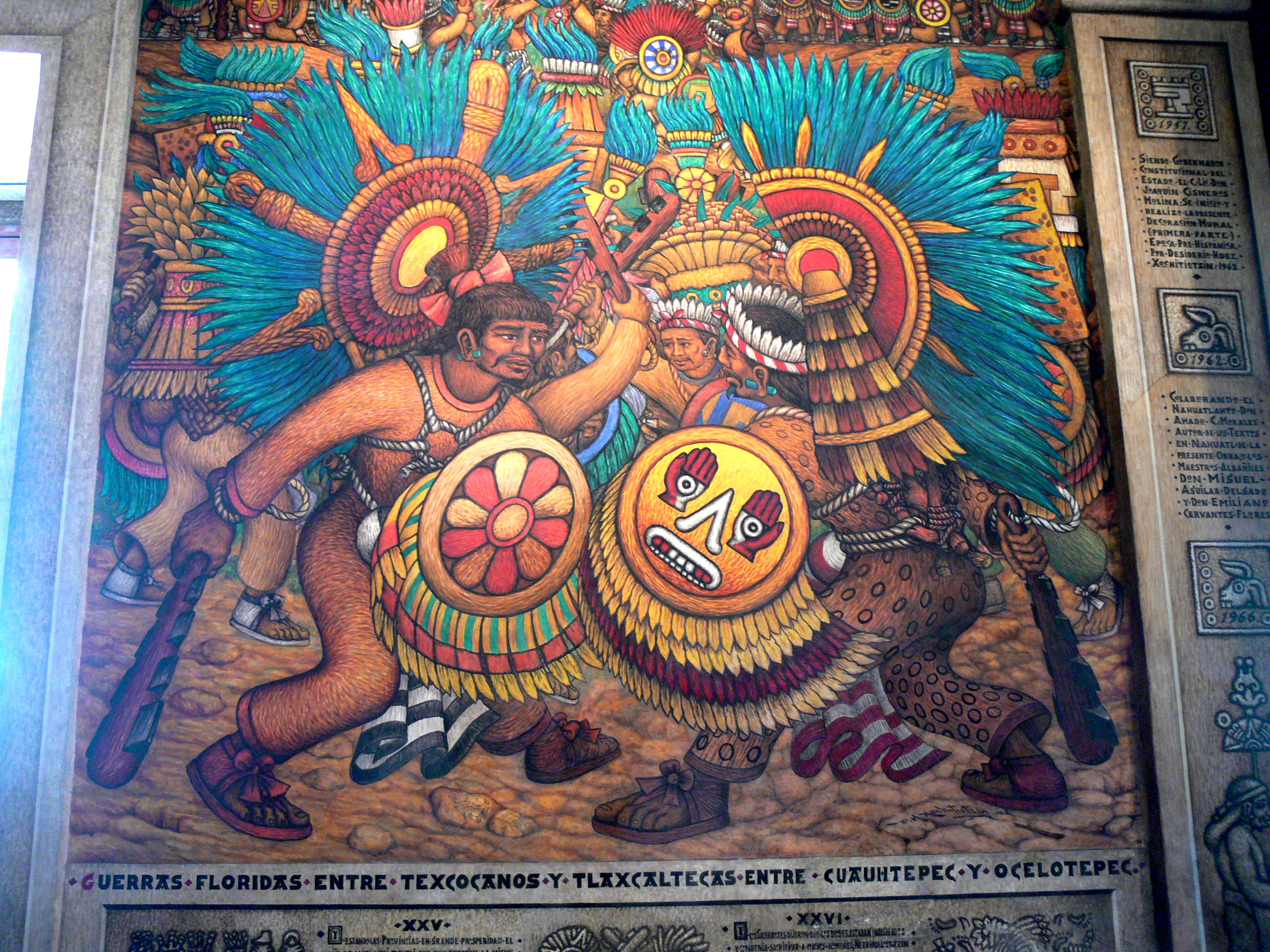
Tlaxcaltec warriors fighting against warriors from Texcoco, Cuauhtepec, and Ocelotepec.

Far from being a passive victim, Tlaxcala was a prominent military actor, capable of confronting the Mexica Empire on equal terms. Historical sources document Tlaxcaltec victories, such as the one in 1504 during the reign of Moctezuma II, which resulted in a defeat for the Triple Alliance forces. Tlaxcaltec warriors were known throughout Mesoamerica for their skill with the bow and arrow, as well as with the makkwawitl, the wooden sword edged with obsidian blades.

At the beginning of the 16th century, the Mexica confederation incorporated the great majority of the Otomi peoples, with the exception of a minority who took refuge in the republic of Tlaxcala (known as the "Otomi of Tlaxcala"), establishing themselves in the mountainous areas. They joined the army and were entrusted with the defence of the borders.

Between 1520 and 1521, other peoples joined these two nations opposing the Triple Alliance — including Cempoala, Tlaxcala, Huejotzingo, Cholula, and Chalco — and in the final months still more, such as Xochimilco, Churubusco, Mexicaltzingo, Mixquic, Cuitláhuac, Iztapalapa, and Coyoacán; forming a coalition that historian Enrique Semo called "the anti-Mexica alliance".

The leaders of the four cities of Tlaxcala agreed to accept Christianity, and were baptized in July of 1520 in a decision that reflected both the Tlaxcalan submission to the Spanish Crown, and the unified front with which they did so. At the time, their tlatoani (elected leader) was a man named Xicotencatl.

=== Hispanic-Tlaxcaltec encounter ===
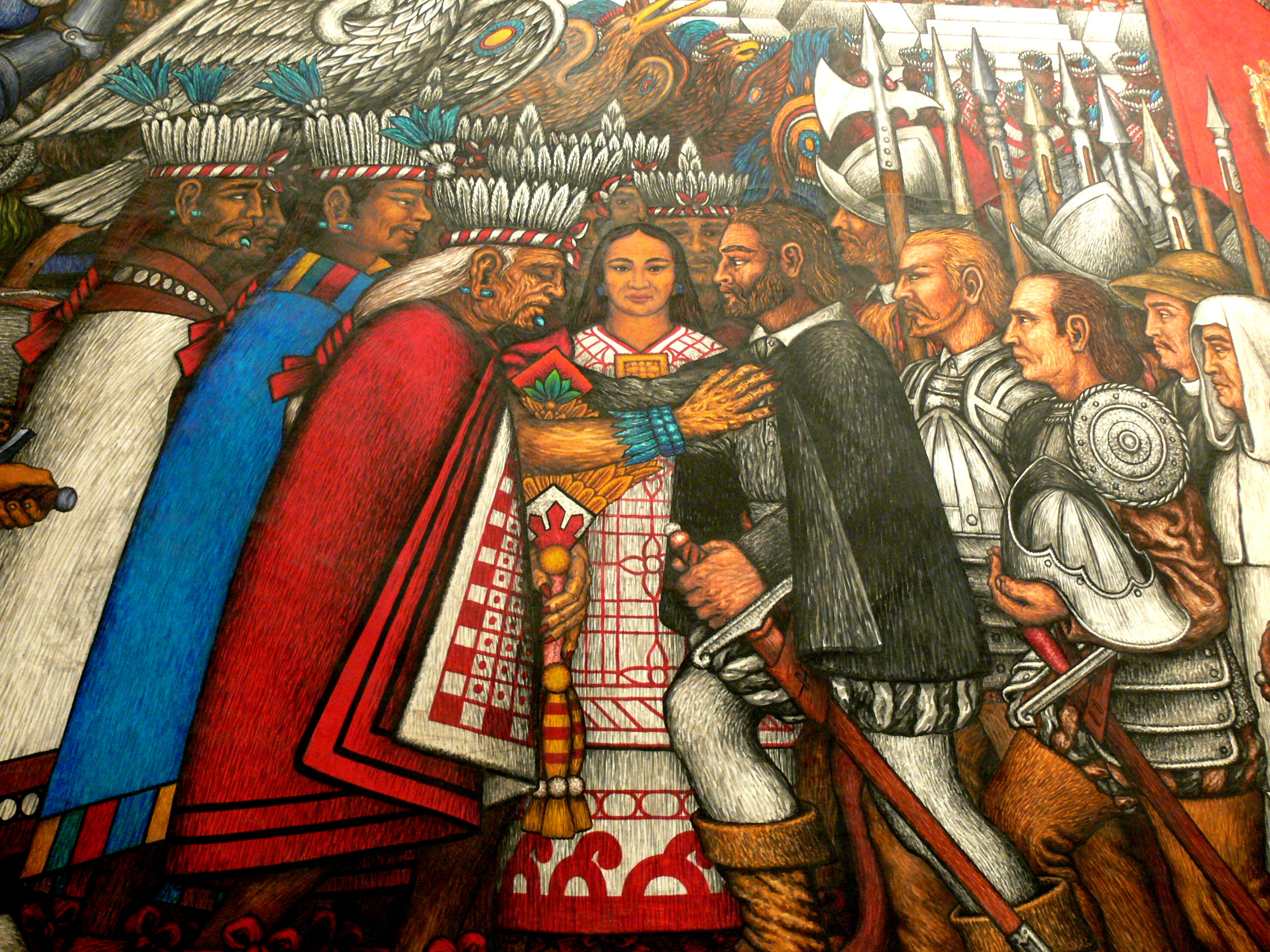
Meeting between Cortés and the rulers of the Four Lordships, detail from the murals of the Tlaxcala Government Palace.

The arrival of the Spanish expedition led by Hernán Cortés in September 1519 marked a turning point in Tlaxcaltec history. The relationship between the two peoples initially developed through military confrontations, followed by negotiations that culminated in a political-military alliance that would prove decisive for the subsequent course of the conquest of Mexico. When the Spanish forces, accompanied by Totonac allies, reached the border of Tlaxcallan, the Tlaxcaltec senate decided to respond militarily. The chronicles record that the Spanish requested peaceful passage, but the Tlaxcaltec authorities, suspecting possible ties with the Mexica Empire, chose to confront them.

A series of engagements unfolded, commanded by the Tlaxcaltec general Xicohténcatl Axayacatzin ("the Younger"), in which, according to the sources, tens of thousands of Tlaxcaltec warriors participated. The combats were characterised by the contrast between the military technologies and warfare concepts of both cultures: the Spanish used firearms, crossbows, steel armour, and cavalry, while the Tlaxcaltecs vastly outnumbered them and knew the terrain. The main battles took place near Tecoac and Tzompantepec. Spanish sources also record attacks on settlements during this period. The confrontations generated an intense debate in the Tlaxcaltec collective government between two positions: continuing military resistance or negotiating an alliance. The faction led by Xicohténcatl the Younger advocated maintaining independence against any external power, while lords such as Maxixcatzin and Xicohténcatl "the Elder" considered that an alliance with the Spanish could prove advantageous against the Mexica Empire.

On 23 September 1519, the Tlaxcaltec lords presented themselves before Cortés to formalise an agreement. The pact included recognition of the authority of the king of Spain, acceptance of Christianity, and the handing over of sons of nobles as a guarantee of compliance. In exchange, special privileges were established for Tlaxcala, including autonomy in its internal government and exemption from certain tributes. This alliance proved strategically significant for the Spanish campaign. The Tlaxcaltecs provided military forces, logistical supplies, and refuge after the Spanish retreat from Tenochtitlan during La Noche Triste. Their participation was decisive in the final siege of the Mexica capital and in subsequent conquest expeditions.

The characterisation of these events has been the subject of academic debate. Various historians emphasise different aspects of the process. Some authors underline the Tlaxcaltec military defeats and consider that the alliance was established under conditions of prior submission, using terms such as "conquest" to describe this initial phase. Other scholars emphasise the negotiated nature of the resulting pact, the preservation of Tlaxcaltec political autonomy during the colonial period, and their active participation as allied conquistadors in other regions, preferring to characterise the process as a "strategic alliance" between political entities. Charles Gibson notes that "if the Tlaxcaltecs had been able to defeat the Spanish in combat, that alliance would not have existed," suggesting that both elements — military pressure and political calculation — were decisive.

==== Lienzo de Tlaxcala ====
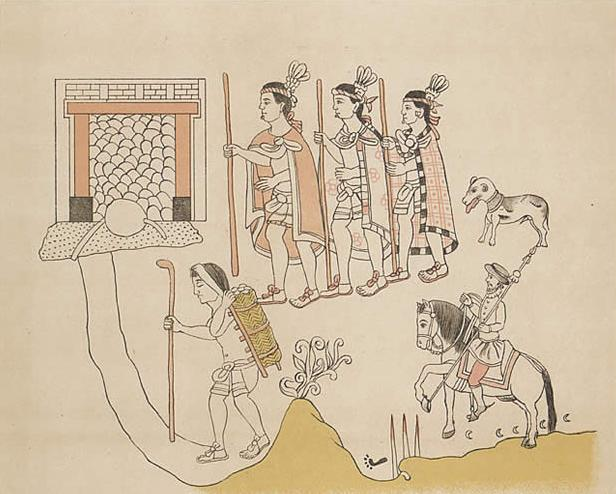
Lienzo de Tlaxcala image depicting Tlaxcalan soldiers leading a Spanish soldier to Chalco.

The Tlaxcaltec perspective on these events was monumentally recorded in the Lienzo de Tlaxcala, an extensive pictographic codex produced in the mid-16th century. This document, rather than being a neutral historical chronicle, is a work of a political and legal character, designed with a very specific purpose: to serve as evidence before the Spanish Crown of its indispensable role in the conquest. Its aim was to justify and ensure fulfilment of the promised privileges, such as autonomy and tax exemption, that had been granted to them.

The iconography of the lienzo presents a narrative in which Tlaxcaltec warriors appear fighting alongside the Spanish, sometimes in greater numbers and in prominent positions. The Tlaxcaltec lords are depicted negotiating with Cortés as equals, and figures such as Malintzin (La Malinche) are highlighted as key mediators. Some studies note that the lienzo emphasises Tlaxcala's participation and minimises that of Cortés's other indigenous allies, such as the Totonacs, Huejotzincas, and Texcocans. In this way, it constructs a narrative that positions Tlaxcala as the principal partner in the Spanish victory.

=== Tlaxcaltec conquistadors: expansion and privileges in the viceroyalty ===
The Tlaxcaltec alliance with Hernán Cortés did not conclude with the Fall of Tenochtitlan in 1521 but consolidated a far-reaching political-military bond. From very early on, the Tlaxcaltecs considered themselves "conquistadors" alongside the Spanish, not mere auxiliaries: in the Lienzo de Tlaxcala they themselves documented their services, their loyalty, and the privileges granted by Charles V, such as the title of "Loyal City" and their own coat of arms.

==== Privileged status: Indian republic ====
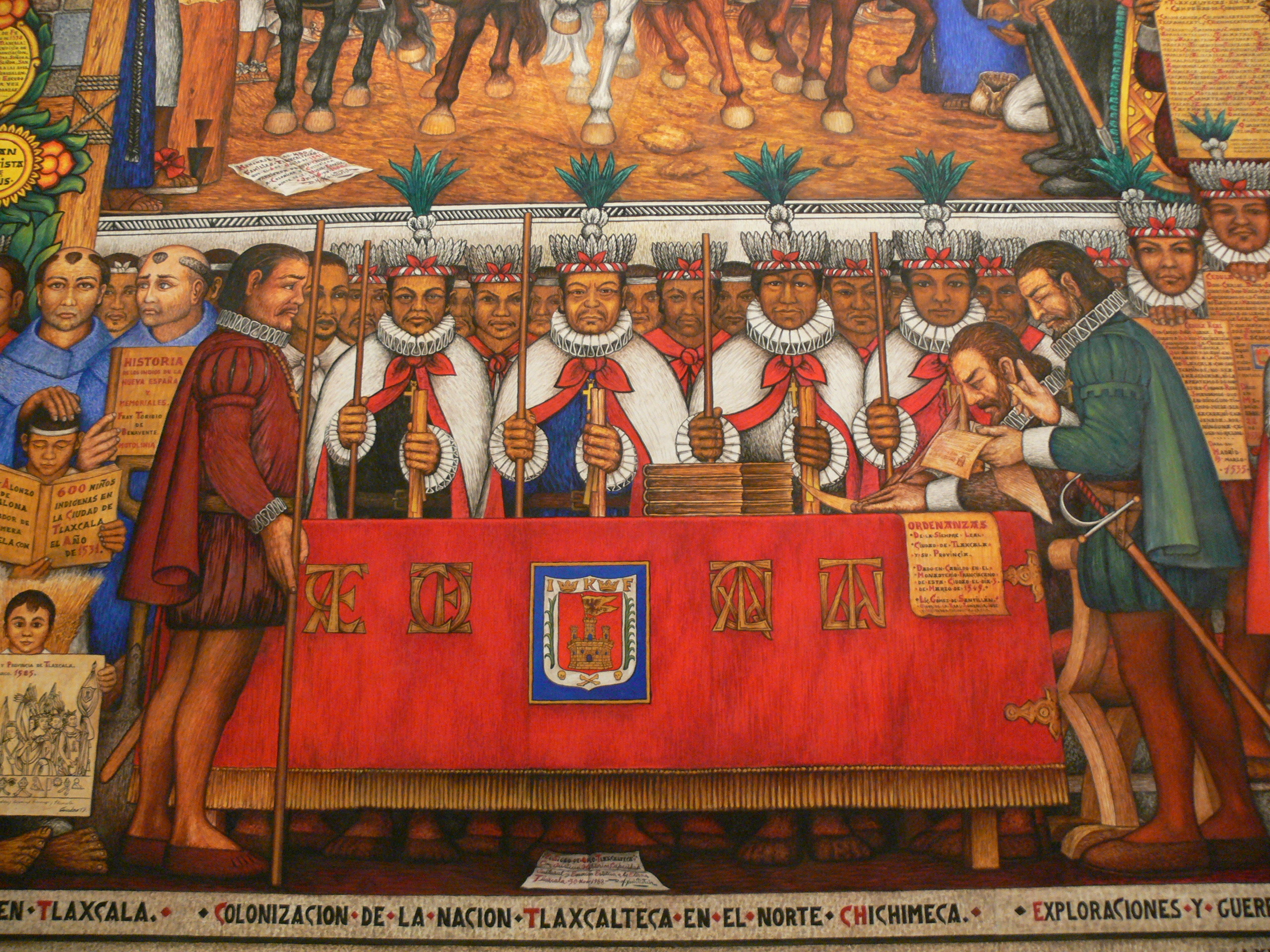
Tlaxcala obtains the status of a Spanish province, detail from the murals of the Government Palace of Tlaxcala.

In reward for its loyalty and decisive military contribution, the Spanish Crown granted the Province of Tlaxcala a legal status unparalleled in New Spain. It was constituted as an "Indian republic", which guaranteed it a high degree of political autonomy. They retained their own indigenous government, the Cabildo — a continuation of their pre-Hispanic senate — and received the most coveted privilege: perpetual exemption from the payment of tribute and the alcabala. Moreover, Tlaxcaltec nobles were recognised within the rank of hidalgos of the Castilian nobility, with the right to use the title of "Don", to carry Spanish weapons such as swords and arquebuses, and to ride horses — prerogatives normally forbidden to the indigenous population.

==== Capitulations of 1591 ====
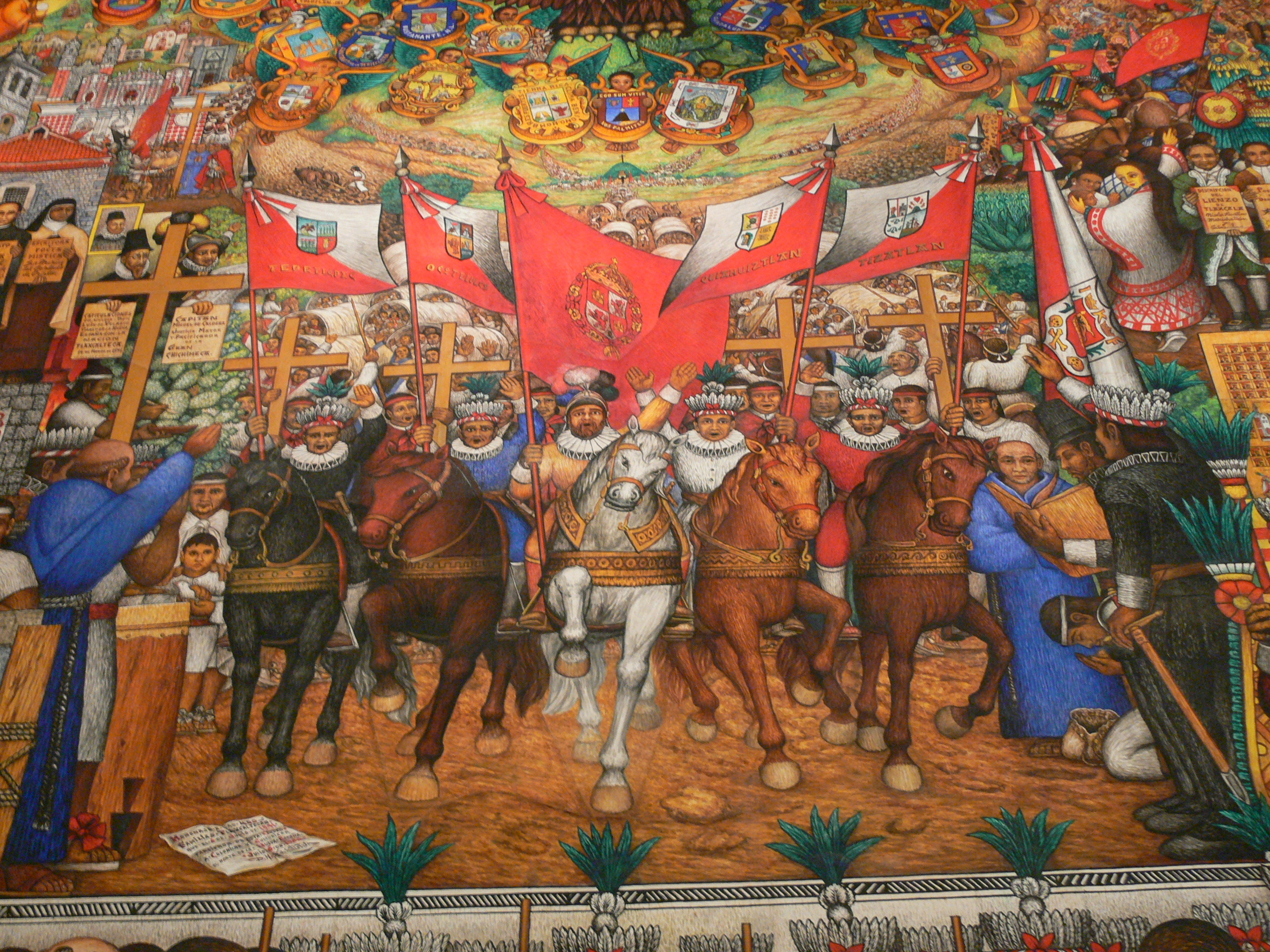
The Tlaxcaltec diaspora, in the murals of the Tlaxcala Government Palace.

At the end of the 16th century, when Spanish expansion northward was halted by the fierce resistance of the semi-nomadic peoples generically known as Chichimecs, the viceroyalty once again turned to its proven allies. The Capitulaciones de 1591, signed by Viceroy Luis de Velasco II, were not so much an order as a negotiated contract between two political entities. They agreed on the transfer of 400 Tlaxcaltec families to establish colonies on the northern frontier. These agreements reaffirmed and extended their privileges to the new territories.

They were guaranteed land ownership, exemption from taxes and personal services, and strict legal and physical separation from Spanish settlements. Their mission was to act as indios madrineros, that is, as a model of civilised life for the Chichimec peoples, whom they were to teach sedentary agriculture, Christian doctrine, and Hispanic and indigenous forms of social organisation. In this way, they would become a wedge of pacification and acculturation in a hostile region.

Key privileges granted in the Tlaxcaltec Capitulations of 1591
Category of privilege	Specific terms granted	Source(s)
Status and nobility	Perpetual hidalgo status for settlers and their descendants. Right to use the title of "Don."	
Tax exemption	Perpetual exemption from all forms of tribute, sales tax (alcabala), and pechos.	
Labour exemption	Perpetual exemption from personal services and forced labour conscription.	
Military rights	Right for principales and their descendants to own and carry Spanish weapons (swords, firearms) and to ride saddled horses.	
Land and property	Guaranteed grants of lands, pastures, and water rights.	
Political autonomy	Right to establish their own autonomous towns with their own cabildos, under indigenous leadership and separate from Spanish jurisdiction.	

Number	Capitulacion
1	The Tlaxcalan settlers and their descendants will be Hidalgos (noblemen) in perpetuity, free from tribute, taxes, and personal service for all time.
2	They will not be compelled to settle with Spaniards. They will live in their own districts (barrios).
3	They will live separately from the Chichimecas, and this will apply to their lots, pastures, and fishing rights.
4	No grants of land for the largest livestock (ganado mayor: cattle, horses, mules, oxen) shall be allowed within three leagues (9 miles) of Tlaxcalan settlements.
5	The markets in new settlements shall be free and exempt from sales tax, and all forms of taxation, for 30 years.
6	The chief men (principals) of Tlaxcala who go to new settlements—and their descendants—shall be permitted to carry arms and ride saddled horses without penalty.
7	The Tlaxcalans going north should be given the necessary provisions and clothing for up to two years.
8	They should receive aid in cultivation of their fields for two years.

The Tlaxcalan colonies in the Chichimeca territories included settlements in the modern states of Coahuila, Durango, Jalisco, Nuevo León, San Luis Potosí and Zacatecas. The colonies included Nueva Tlaxcala de Nuestra Señora de Guadalupe de Horcasistas—today known as Guadalupe—and Santiago de las Sabinas, today known as Sabinas Hidalgo, in Nuevo León; Villa de Nueva Tlaxcala de Quiahuistlán, today known as Colotlán, in Jalisco; and San Esteban de Nueva Tlaxcala in Coahuila, today part of Saltillo.

Tlaxcalan officers and soldiers also participated in the Spanish conquest of the Philippines, with some permanently settling on the islands and contributing Nahuatl words to the Philippine languages.

In return for Tlaxcalan assistance in toppling the Aztec Empire, and in other conquests, Maxixcatzin—then the governor of Tlaxcala—demanded and was granted a personal audience with the King of Spain, Charles V, in 1534. Tlaxcala was given several special privileges, among them being a coat of arms and the right to petition the king directly for redress of grievances. Charles also declared that Tlaxcala should answer to none but himself.

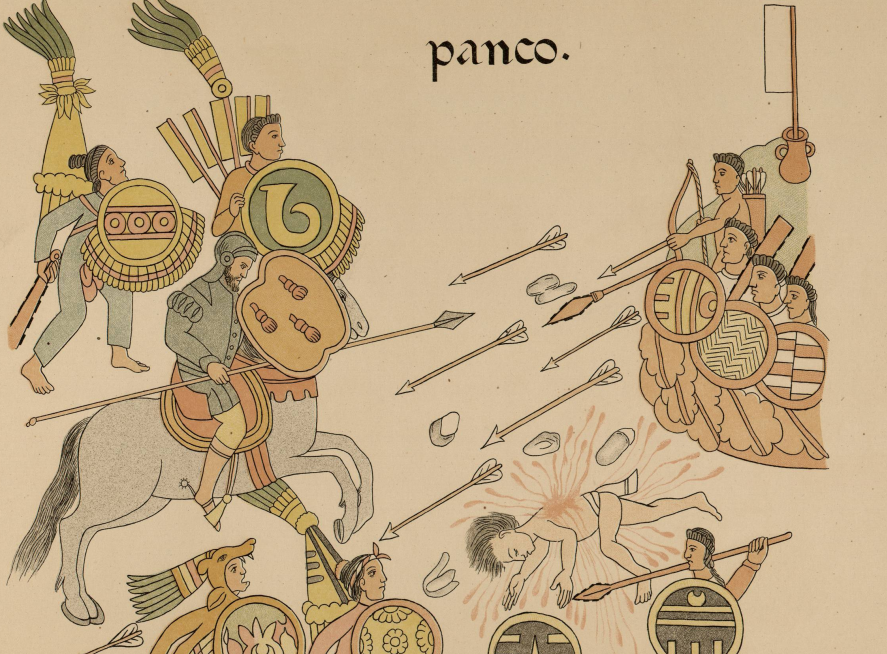
Tlaxcaltecs in Pánuco.

Some of the missions and towns founded by the Tlaxcaltecs in the present-day state of Nuevo León were San Miguel de Aguayo (now Bustamante), Nueva Tlaxcala de Nuestra Señora de Guadalupe de Horcasistas (now Guadalupe), Santiago de las Sabinas (now Sabinas Hidalgo), and many others. Agustín de la Cruz, founder of the first, is recognised as one of the most influential Tlaxcaltec colonisers of northeastern Mexico.

In the state of Coahuila, they founded the city of San Esteban de Nueva Tlaxcala, now part of Saltillo. Also in Coahuila, from its foundation, Santa María de las Parras (now Parras de la Fuente) was governed by indigenous authorities, alongside a minority of Spanish settlers. Moreover, only Tlaxcaltecs could vote and stand for election as rector and deputy, which were the highest authorities.

Thousands also participated in the conquest of the Huasteca and the colonisation of the north of the New Kingdom of León, whose presence there helped to integrate groups of Coahuiltecan indigenous people, mainly Alazapas, into viceregal society. One example is the involvement of some of them in a tribute paid in honour of the death of Philip V of Spain in San Miguel de Aguayo, and by 1775 some Alazapas were already permitted to ride horses and carry weapons.

===== Central America =====
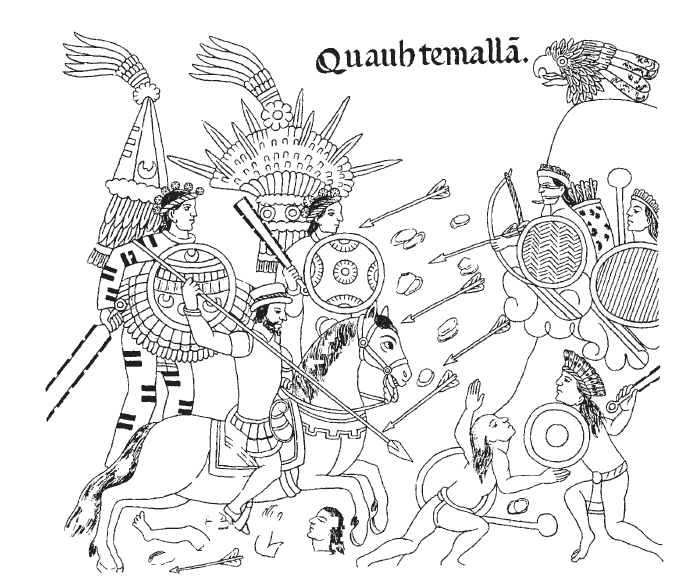
Tlaxcaltecs in Guatemala.

Between 1524 and 1527, Pedro de Alvarado, husband of Tecuelhuetzin (baptised as Doña Luisa Xicohténcatl), with a large number of Tlaxcaltecs in his ranks, conquered the Mayan lordships of Guatemala and the Cuzcatlecs of El Salvador. Largely owing to Tlaxcaltec colonisation, today many cities from Guatemala to Nicaragua bear place names of Nahuatl origin.

Following the conquest, a system was established in which the Tlaxcaltecs and their descendants enjoyed great privileges for centuries: they were granted coats of arms, used firearms and horses, and paid no taxes. In the 17th century, they began to call themselves "Tlaxcaltecs of Ciudad Vieja" or "Mexicans of Ciudad Vieja", and Tlaxcaltec presence in Guatemala continued to be recognised into the 19th century.

A significant number of Guatemalan place names—including the name “Guatemala” itself—derive from Tlaxcalan Nahuatl. Tlaxcalan colonists also founded a number of settlements in northern Mexico (including parts of present-day southeastern Texas), where conquest of local tribes by the Spaniards had proved unsuccessful. They settled areas inhabited by nomadic and bellicose tribes (known as the Chichimeca) to pacify the local Indigenous groups hostile to the Spanish Crown.

===== United States =====
In the founding of the cities of Santa Fe, Albuquerque, Las Cruces, San Antonio, and San Andrés de Nava, Tlaxcaltec colonisers accompanied the Spanish and helped to settle and quell the revolts of the indigenous peoples of New Mexico and Texas. In Santa Fe, they founded and settled the Barrio de Analco, and in Albuquerque, the Barrio de Atrisco. In both, together with the Spanish, they suffered the Pueblo Revolt. After the revolt, most settled in El Paso. Another New Mexico locality, Nueva Tlaxcala (now Taos), was named in honour of the colonisers.

There were also Tlaxcaltecs in the expedition of conquistador Juan de Oñate (son-in-law of Leonor Cortés Moctezuma). It is known that they were miners at Monte Chalchihuitl (to which they gave this Nahuatl name), in the locality of Los Cerrillos, since, although the Spanish did not attach importance to the mineral that abounds there (turquoise), the Tlaxcaltecs valued it above any other stone.

===== Philippines =====
The Tlaxcaltecs accompanied Miguel López de Legazpi in the conquest of the Philippine Islands, where part of the crew was Tlaxcaltec. There they settled and mingled with the indigenous Tagalog society. They also participated in explorations of Pacific islands and joined other New Spaniards in the wars of the region alongside the Spanish.

A notable example is their role in the battles of Cagayán of 1582, where Tlaxcaltec warriors, among other New Spanish soldiers, equipped with Spanish weaponry and their own tactics, successfully fought against Asian pirates, mainly wakō, and secured Spanish control of northern Philippines. The legacy of the Tlaxcaltecs and, more broadly, of the Nahua peoples in the archipelago can be seen in many aspects, from their cuisine (primarily tamales) to influences on their most widely spoken languages, such as Filipino and Cebuano, which today contain a large number of words derived from Nahuatl.

===== South America =====
The expedition of Pedro de Alvarado to Peru departed from Guatemala in early 1534. According to a tradition circulated in some later colonial chronicles and recorded by various authors, this force supposedly included a significant Tlaxcaltec contingent, drawn by Alvarado's marriage to Tecuelhuetzin.

It is claimed that, of the approximately four thousand men who departed, half — some two thousand — were indigenous people from Guatemala and Tlaxcala, and that, after crossing the coast of present-day Ecuador and advancing southward, some seven hundred and fifty Tlaxcaltecs remained in the new territory, of whom approximately two hundred reportedly took part in the founding of Lima and the rest in the reorganisation of Cusco. It is known that in the 16th century a large number of people in Cusco already bore the surname "mexicano," indicating they were originally from the region called the Kingdom of Mexico.

However, Spanish manuscript sources from the 16th century do not explicitly record the presence of Tlaxcaltec warriors in Alvarado's expedition. Neither Pedro Cieza de León in his Crónica del Perú, nor Pedro Pizarro in his Relaciones make mention of Mesoamerican indigenous companions in the campaigns against the Inca Empire.

Don Diego de Almagro, with some Spaniards, went to Quito because he received news that Don Pedro de Alvarado had disembarked at Puerto Viejo with five hundred men who had crossed from Guatemala, and that he was traversing the mountains from Puerto Viejo toward Quito, as was indeed the case. In this Quito was [Sebastián de] Benalcázar, with some men he had gathered on the orders of the Marquis, from Tangaralá, who had come from Nicaragua after it had been settled.

Likewise, the founding records of Lima (1535) and the re-founding of Cusco contain no direct references to settlers originally from the region of central Mexico, suggesting that Tlaxcaltec participation remains in the realm of tradition and historiographic hypothesis.

== Present day ==
=== Identity and post-colonial narrative ===
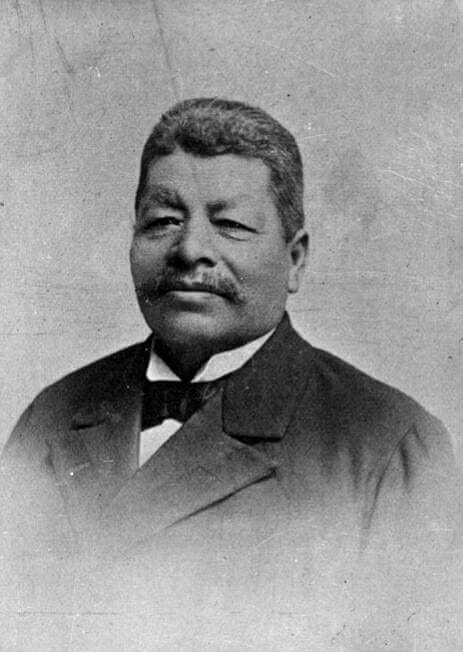
After Mexican independence, from 1885 to 1911, the governor of Tlaxcala was Próspero Cahuantzi, who was an indigenous Tlaxcaltec. Cahuantzi promoted the preservation of indigenous culture and artefacts in Mexico. He also bore a Nahuatl surname, something common in Tlaxcala owing to its ancient alliance with Spain, which protected them from the imposition of Spanish baptismal names.

Tlaxcala's status changed drastically with the end of the viceroyalty and the emergence of Mexico as an independent country at the beginning of the 19th century. The new nation-state sought to construct, through assimilation, an identity and a founding myth that would unify a culturally, ethnically, and linguistically diverse population. The Creole and mestizo elite that led this process opted for a narrative of origin centred on an idealisation of the pre-Hispanic past and carefully selected its heroes and villains.

The figure of the Mexica Empire and its last independent tlahtoani, Cuauhtémoc, was exalted as the symbol of heroic resistance and the seed of nationhood. According to Federico Navarrete, the conquest was simplified into a "Manichaean narrative" pitting brave indigenous people (Mexica) against oppressive invaders (Spanish). In this new official history, the political complexity of Mesoamerica and the existence of indigenous alliances and rivalries had no place.

Within this framework, Tlaxcala's strategic alliance was reinterpreted as a betrayal. They were labelled as such for having allied with foreigners to destroy their "racial brethren". This stigma was consolidated through the educational system and political discourse for more than a century, deeply rooting it in the popular Mexican imagination and obscuring their role as a founding people with their own history and autonomy.

However, since the late 20th century, a wave of historical revisionism, led by scholars such as Federico Navarrete and Andrea Martínez Baracs, has begun to challenge this traditional view. Drawing on primary sources and an analysis free from anachronisms influenced by nationalist ideas, these historians have reappraised Tlaxcala's decisions as acts of a realpolitik coherent with their context.

=== Demographics and distribution ===
The Nahuas of Tlaxcala, also related to the Otomi, have come to develop and maintain their organisation in the villages on the western slopes of the volcano La Malinche or "Matlalcueye", primarily in the settlements of Acxotla del Monte, San Pedro Tlalcuapan, San Pedro Muñoztla, San Pedro Xochiteotla, San Felipe Cuauhtenco, San Miguel Xaltipan, Guadalupe Tlachco, San Isidro Buen Suceso, San Pablo del Monte, San Cosme Mazatecochco, San Bartolomé Cuahuixmatlac, and San Rafael Tepatlaxco. The identity of the Nahuas of Tlaxcala exists there today — peoples who resisted the Mexica advance and participated as allies of Hernán Cortés — and in this way these communities demonstrate the historical presence of Tlaxcaltec groups, contributing to a broader understanding of the formation of Mexico.

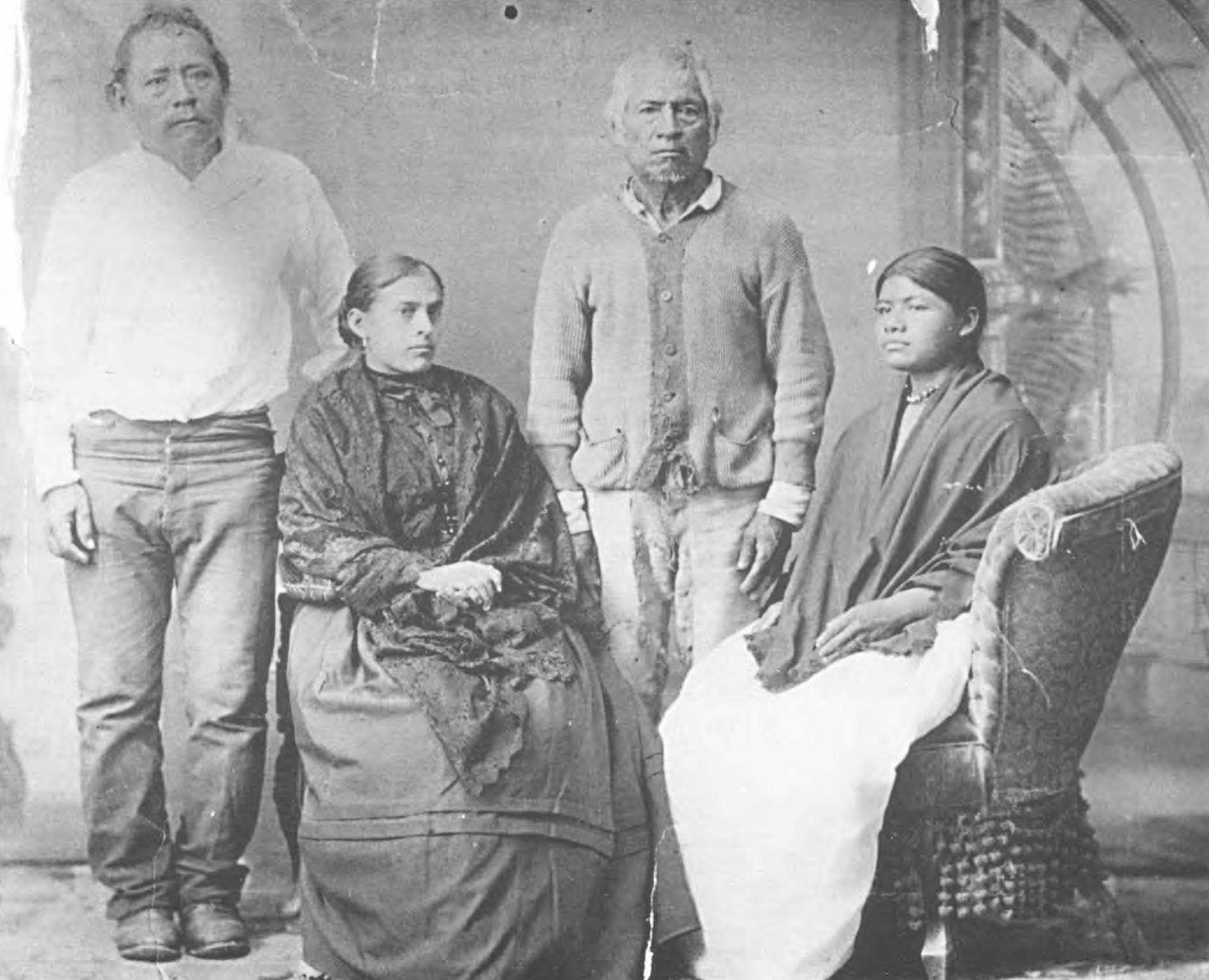
Portrait of a Nuevo León family of Tlaxcaltec origin (1890).

Likewise, various Nahua groups of Tlaxcaltec origin who settled in other regions of the country preserve their identity and cultural heritage linked to Tlaxcala. This is the case, for example, of the people of the municipality of Bustamante, in Nuevo León, the indigenous communities of the municipality of Lagos de Moreno, in Jalisco, and the village of San Juan Argueta in Sololá, Guatemala. The existence of these communities is tangible testimony that contradicts the "narrative of forgetting" (including the myth of mestizaje) and demands a more inclusive and precise vision of the plurality of actors who participated in the formation of present-day Mexico, vindicating their history as an indigenous people.

According to data from the Instituto Nacional de Estadística y Geografía (INEGI) from the 2020 census, in the state of Tlaxcala there are approximately 27,174 persons aged three years or older who report speaking an indigenous language. This represents around 2% of the state's population. The predominant language among indigenous speakers in Tlaxcala is Nahuatl, with around 23,171 speakers. It is followed by Totonac (also known as tutunakú), with approximately 1,910 speakers, and then Otomi (locally called yuhmu) with 602 speakers. There is also a small group that speaks Mazatec (around 281 people).

Geographically, Nahuatl speakers are concentrated mainly in four municipalities: Ixtenco, Mazatecochco, Tetlanohcan, and Contla de Juan Cuamatzi. Otomi (yuhmu) is preserved mainly in Ixtenco, though its numbers have been declining. As a result, the state does not figure among Mexico's regions with the largest indigenous population, and the presence of indigenous language speakers in Tlaxcala is limited.

A recent study — cited by the National Institute of Indigenous Languages (INALI) — warns that these languages are at risk: between 2015 and 2020 a notable decline was recorded. In 2015, INEGI counted 32,994 indigenous language speakers in the state; by 2020 the figure had fallen by 5,820 persons. During that period, the number of Otomi (yuhmu) speakers fell from 736 to 602, and Nahuatl speakers declined from 27,518 to 23,171. According to specialists cited by INALI, if urgent language revitalisation measures are not implemented, these indigenous languages could disappear within two decades or "perhaps less".

=== Language and education ===
Although Nahuatl remains the dominant indigenous language in Tlaxcala, its vitality is compromised by a weakening in intergenerational transmission. Experts warn that many children and young people no longer learn the language fluently; in some cases their knowledge is limited to isolated words or phrases, preventing its use as an everyday language. Languages with fewer speakers — such as Otomi or Mazatec — face an even more critical situation: their small number of speakers and low intergenerational transmission rate increase their vulnerability to disappearance. Among the structural factors that explain this loss of vitality are the dominance of Spanish in institutional and educational settings, which promotes Hispanicisation; as well as the sociocultural marginalisation that can lead speakers to abandon their language out of fear of discrimination.

Population of Nahuatl speakers in Tlaxcala
Year	Total population	Male	Female	Ref.
1930	9,329	3,609	5,720	
1940	6,973	2,789	4,184	
1950	410	177	233	
1960	2,248	1,032	1,216	
1970	18,404	9,179	9,225	
1980	26,072	14,241	11,831	
1990	19,388	9,828	9,560	
2000	23,737	12,018	11,719	
2010	23,402	11,881	11,521	

To counter this decline, in 2025 INALI, in coordination with state authorities of Tlaxcala, launched a programme of "revitalisation and transmission" of indigenous languages. This plan includes the documentation of oral accounts, the production of bilingual educational materials (indigenous language–Spanish), the delivery of community workshops, and the creation of spaces for the teaching and everyday use of the languages. In addition, specialists have proposed carrying out participatory sociolinguistic assessments in each community — ideally with the support of international bodies — with the aim of designing local revitalisation projects, cultural awareness-raising, and the reinforcement of linguistic identity.

=== Community and political organisation ===
In Tlaxcala there persists a community network with pre-Hispanic roots — derived from the Nahua calpulli — that has transformed to coexist with the structures of modern municipal government. Historically, the Nahua peoples of Tlaxcala organised themselves in calpullis: social, economic, and cultural units that combined kinship, territory, rituals, and community responsibilities. Although many communities have lost some of the visible markers of identity — such as traditional dress or everyday use of Nahuatl — forms of sociability and community life that hark back to that ancestral order still survive.

In various communities, a system of rotating offices persists: communal, religious, or civic duties assumed by community members for a set period, without formal remuneration but with social recognition — a structure that reinforces internal cohesion. Likewise, the practice of communal labour — faenas, tequio, or collective work — and the use of assemblies for community decision-making are maintained, giving continuity to the traditional collective ethos. These forms of organisation constitute a "post-Nahua identity": although many material traits have been lost or transformed, the centrality of community, reciprocity, communal obligations, and collective participation continue to define the social fabric in many localities.

==== Community presidencies: submunicipal structure ====
Rather than autonomous municipalities as in some entities with a strong indigenous presence, in Tlaxcala the institutional pathway for recognising communal organisation has been the creation of Community Presidencies — submunicipal bodies dependent on the municipal government but with specific responsibilities for attending to localities far from the municipal seat. These presidencies are legally recognised as auxiliary authorities of the municipal councils. When a settlement other than the municipal seat meets certain requirements — such as minimum population, capacity for service provision, land for a community seat, and a cemetery — it may be declared a community presidency.

The head of the presidency is elected for a three-year term, coinciding with the municipal council election. For communities that so decide, the election may be held through universal, free, and secret suffrage, or under the traditional system of usos y costumbres, as determined by the catalogue of the Tlaxcaltec Electoral Institute (ITE). Community presidencies act as representatives of the municipality in their area, with delegated responsibilities that include maintaining order and security, representing the municipality, managing local services, and attending municipal council sessions with voice and vote when applicable. This figure represents, for many communities, a way of institutionalising their traditional structures within the framework of the Mexican state, providing a path for political recognition and local representation without the need to become autonomous municipalities.

==== Tensions and transformations ====
Although community presidencies partly reproduce the structure of the calpulli, these organisations face challenges. In many cases, adherence to this system depends on the community's collective decision to seek recognition from the authorities; not all localities have chosen to join the state catalogue. This means that the community network in Tlaxcala is heterogeneous: some localities operate under community presidencies with election by usos y costumbres; others are governed by regular municipal channels. Moreover, although community presidencies have formal powers, their actual capacity to meet local needs varies. Their function is often limited to administrative or representative matters, and the traditional rotation of offices, communal faenas, or collective reciprocity have lost strength in some areas, affected by urbanisation, migration, economic changes, and cultural assimilation. This transformation has been interpreted by recent studies as a modernisation of traditional communalism, but also as an erosion of the original community system.

=== Economy and activities ===
In addition to traditional agriculture and wage labour in the industrial or service sectors, in some communities of Tlaxcala collective economic practices of exchange and own production persist, responding to the dynamics of the solidarity economy — that is, systems of production, consumption, and distribution based on cooperation, reciprocity, and food sovereignty. One of the most visible examples of this community economy is the barter tianguis in the capital of Tlaxcala, an initiative organised by a local collective that promotes the exchange of goods without the use of money. This tianguis takes place monthly — often on the last Sunday of each month — in the lobby of the Palacio de Cultura in the Tlaxcaltec capital.

People from various municipalities participate: they exchange everything from food (such as tortillas, vegetables, bread, and tamales) to medicinal plants, handicrafts, books, clothing, toys, and utensils, always ensuring that the products are in good condition. The idea behind the barter — and the collective — is to offer an alternative to money-based consumption: to promote local production, reduce waste, strengthen community networks, support the domestic, artisanal, or peasant economy, and revalue exchange as a social practice. Although the tianguis has a history of several years, it has received media coverage as a solidarity economy initiative, suggesting a renewed social interest in this type of practice.

=== Culture, heritage, and traditions ===
The tradition of Talavera-style ceramics in Tlaxcala — along with that of Puebla — was inscribed in 2019 by UNESCO on its Representative List of the Intangible Cultural Heritage of Humanity. The inscription recognises that the traditional manufacturing processes — clay preparation, wheel or mould shaping, decoration, glazing, and kiln firing — follow an artisanal pattern equivalent to that used in the 16th century, transmitted from master ceramicists to new generations in family workshops. Each workshop preserves a particular identity, manifested in variations in modelling, ornamentation, colours, and glazes. The resulting pieces — utilitarian, decorative, or architectural — constitute a cultural symbol of regional identity, reflecting the historical continuity and living heritage of artisanal communities.

==== Festivals and traditional celebrations ====
The celebration of the Tlaxcala Carnival, which dates back to antiquity, is one of the most deeply rooted cultural expressions in the state. It includes dances, music, and groups known as camadas de huehues, colourful costumes, masks, and outfits that blend indigenous, Spanish, and local influences, and goes beyond a simple popular festival: its collective organisation — rehearsals, preparation of costumes, music, and logistics — reinforces community cohesion. The traditions surrounding the carnival are inherited and adapted: in many municipalities the historic camadas are maintained, as is the custom of gathering funds door to door to fund it.

The National Fair of Tlaxcala, for its part, is held annually in the city of the same name, combining cultural, artistic, commercial, agricultural, livestock, and tourism activities. Considered the most important fair in the state, it offers spaces for the exhibition of handicrafts, folk art, shows, attractions, and regional commerce, helping to make local cultural wealth more visible. In addition to these events, the Tlaxcaltec people preserves multiple festive expressions linked to religious, community, and agrarian traditions, many of them with pre-Hispanic or colonial roots adapted to the modern context, such as the Day of the Dead or the Noche que nadie duerme (Night That Nobody Sleeps).

=== Gastronomy and folk arts ===
Traditional Tlaxcala cuisine is characterised by a combination of pre-Hispanic heritage and colonial contributions, with a strong presence of maize, maguey, and regional ingredients. This cultural fusion is reflected in a variety of typical dishes and drinks of the state. Among the most representative dishes is mole prieto (tlilmolli in Nahuatl), a thick, intensely flavoured stew traditional in community celebrations — religious festivities, carnivals, or patron saint festivals — particularly in municipalities such as Contla de Juan Cuamatzi and Santa Ana Chiautempan; as well as tacos de canasta, tlacoyos, and tlatlapas — snacks made from nixtamalised maize dough — as well as mixiotes, escamoles, and Tlaxcaltec soup, among others.

As for traditional drinks, there is pulque and its variants (curados), made from maguey; also ancient cacao drinks, pre-Hispanic heritage, which in some localities such as Zacatelco have been recognised as part of the local cultural heritage. Beyond gastronomy, Tlaxcala preserves traditional forms of folk art: ceramics (such as the aforementioned Talavera), as well as artisanal production of textiles, masks, and utilitarian and decorative objects, which express regional identity and allow the continuity of traditional knowledge.

== See also ==
- Tlaxcala (city)
- Nahua peoples
- Tlaxcala (Nahua state)
- Kingdom of Mexico
- New Spain
- History of Nahuatl
- Captaincy General of the Philippines

== Bibliography ==
- Aboytes Perete, Silvia (2013). Compendio de la Historia de Tlaxcala de Diego Muñoz Camargo [Compendium of the History of Tlaxcala by Diego Muñoz Camargo] (PDF). Universidad Autónoma de Tlaxcala. pp. 15, 16.
- Asselbergs, Florine (2012). Rediscovering Forgotten Memories. Mesoamerican Memory: Enduring Systems of Remembrance.
- Barrón, María Cristina (1992). La presencia novohispana en el Pacífico insular: actas de las segundas jornadas internacionales celebradas en la ciudad de México, del 17 al 21 de septiembre de 1990 [The New Spanish Presence in the Insular Pacific: Proceedings of the Second International Symposium held in Mexico City, 17–21 September 1990] (in Spanish). Universidad Iberoamericana. ISBN 978-968-859-073-7.
- Canales, Carlos; Rey, Miguel del (2021). Naves negras: La aventura del lago Español [Black Ships: The Adventure of the Spanish Lake] (in Spanish). EDAF. ISBN 978-84-414-4115-6.
- Cervantes de Salazar, Francisco Antonio (1914). Historia de Nueva España [History of New Spain]. Madrid: Hispanic Society of America.
- Cortés, Hernán (2014). Cartas de relación [Letters of Relation]. México: Grupo editorial Tomo. ISBN 978-607-415-689-8.
- Díaz del Castillo, Bernal (2022). Historia verdadera de la conquista de la Nueva España [True History of the Conquest of New Spain]. México: Porrúa. ISBN 978-970-077-476-3.
- Félix, Jorge; Vázquez, Sergio (2013). Hernán Cortés y la condición axial de Cempoala en la conquista de México-Tenochtitlan [Hernán Cortés and the Axial Condition of Cempoala in the Conquest of Mexico-Tenochtitlan]. Revista Extremeña de Ciencias Sociales "Almenara".
- Fuentes y Guzmán, Francisco Antonio de (1883) [1690]. Zaragoza, Justo; Navarro, Luis (eds.). Recordación Florida. Discurso historial y demostración natural, material, militar y política del Reyno de Guatemala [Florid Recollection. Historical Discourse and Natural, Material, Military, and Political Account of the Kingdom of Guatemala]. Vol. II. Madrid, España: Central.
- García León, Susana (2004). La justicia indígena en el siglo XVI. Algunos pleitos en lengua náhuatl [Indigenous Justice in the 16th Century. Some Lawsuits in Nahuatl]. Cuadernos de historia del derecho, vol. 11.
- Gibson, Charles (1991). Tlaxcala en el siglo XVI [Tlaxcala in the Sixteenth Century]. México: FCE. ISBN 978-968-163-688-3.
- Gonzales, Moises; Lamadrid, Enrique R. (2019). Nación Genízara: Ethnogenesis, Place, and Identity in New Mexico. University of New Mexico Press. ISBN 978-0-8263-6108-0.
- Guerrero Galván, Luis René; Guerrero Galván, Alonso (2022). Descubrimiento, conquista e institucionalización: de las expediciones al Yucatán a la consolidación de la Nueva España (I). Reflexiones a quinientos años del encuentro de dos mundos [Discovery, Conquest and Institutionalisation: From the Expeditions to Yucatán to the Consolidation of New Spain (I). Reflections Five Hundred Years after the Encounter of Two Worlds] (PDF). Vol. 11. Ciudad de México: Universidad Nacional Autónoma de México. ISBN 978-607-30-6487-3. "Parte IV: Los señoríos sujetos"
- López de Gómara, Francisco (2007). Historia de la conquista de México [History of the Conquest of Mexico] (PDF). Caracas: Fundación Biblioteca Ayacucho.
- de Lorenzana, Francisco Antonio (1770). Crónica de la Nueva España [Chronicle of New Spain]. México: Imprenta del superior Gobierno del Br. D. Joseph Antonio de Hogal, Biblioteca de la Universidad de Sevilla.
- Luna Ruiz, Juan (2007). Nahuas de Tlaxcala: Pueblos Indígenas del México Contemporáneo [Nahuas of Tlaxcala: Indigenous Peoples of Contemporary Mexico] (PDF). Coordinación Editorial de la CDL. ISBN 978-970-753-090-4.
- Martínez Baracs, Andrea (2008). Un gobierno de indios. Tlaxcala 1519 - 1750 [A Government of Indians. Tlaxcala 1519–1750]. Fondo de Cultura Económica. ISBN 978-968-168-538-6.
- Motolinía, Toribio (1903). Memoriales De Fray Toribio De Motolinía [Memorials of Friar Toribio de Motolinía] (in Spanish). Рипол Классик. ISBN 978-5-87723-361-4.
- Navarrete, Federico (2019). ¿Quién conquistó México? [Who Conquered Mexico?] (PDF). Debate. pp. 8, 9. ISBN 978-607-31-8467-0.
- Perales Piqueres, Rosa (2020). La Malinche: mito y realidad de una mujer a través de las artes [La Malinche: Myth and Reality of a Woman Through the Arts]. La mujer en la Europa Renacentista y en el Nuevo Mundo.
- Prescott, William H. (2024). Historia de la conquista de México [History of the Conquest of Mexico]. México: Porrúa.
- Ramos Galicia, Yolanda (2014). Así se come en Tlaxcala: Cocina Indígena y Popular [This Is How We Eat in Tlaxcala: Indigenous and Popular Cuisine] (PDF). Vol. 62. Instituto Nacional de Antropología e Historia y Gobierno del Estado de Tlaxcala. pp. 28, 30. ISBN 978-607-8423-60-6.
- Rendón Garcini, Ricardo (1996). Breve historia de Tlaxcala [Brief History of Tlaxcala]. México: El Colegio de México Fideicomiso Historia de las Américas Fondo de Cultura Económica. ISBN 968-164-542-1.
- Romero, Orlando (2010). All Trails Lead to Santa Fe: An Anthology Commemorating the 400th Anniversary of the Founding of Santa Fe, New Mexico in 1610. Sunstone Press. ISBN 978-0-86534-760-1.
- Soustelle, Jacques (1970). La vida cotidiana de los aztecas en vísperas de la conquista [Daily Life of the Aztecs on the Eve of the Conquest]. México: Fondo de Cultura Económica. ISBN 968-160-636-1.
- Soustelle, Jacques (1993). La familia otomi pame del mexico central [The Otomi-Pame Family of Central Mexico]. México: Centro de Estudios Mexicanos y Centroamericanos, Fondo de Cultura Económica.
- Taladoire, Éric (2018). De América a Europa: Cuando los indígenas descubrieron el Viejo Mundo (1493-1892) [From America to Europe: When the Indigenous Peoples Discovered the Old World (1493–1892)] (in Spanish). Fondo de Cultura Económica. ISBN 978-607-16-5340-6.
- Xelhuantzi, Tesiu Rosas (2008). Descolonizar el pueblo [Decolonising the People]. UNAM.
