= Royal Writ of the Foundation of the City of Tlaxcala, Mexico =

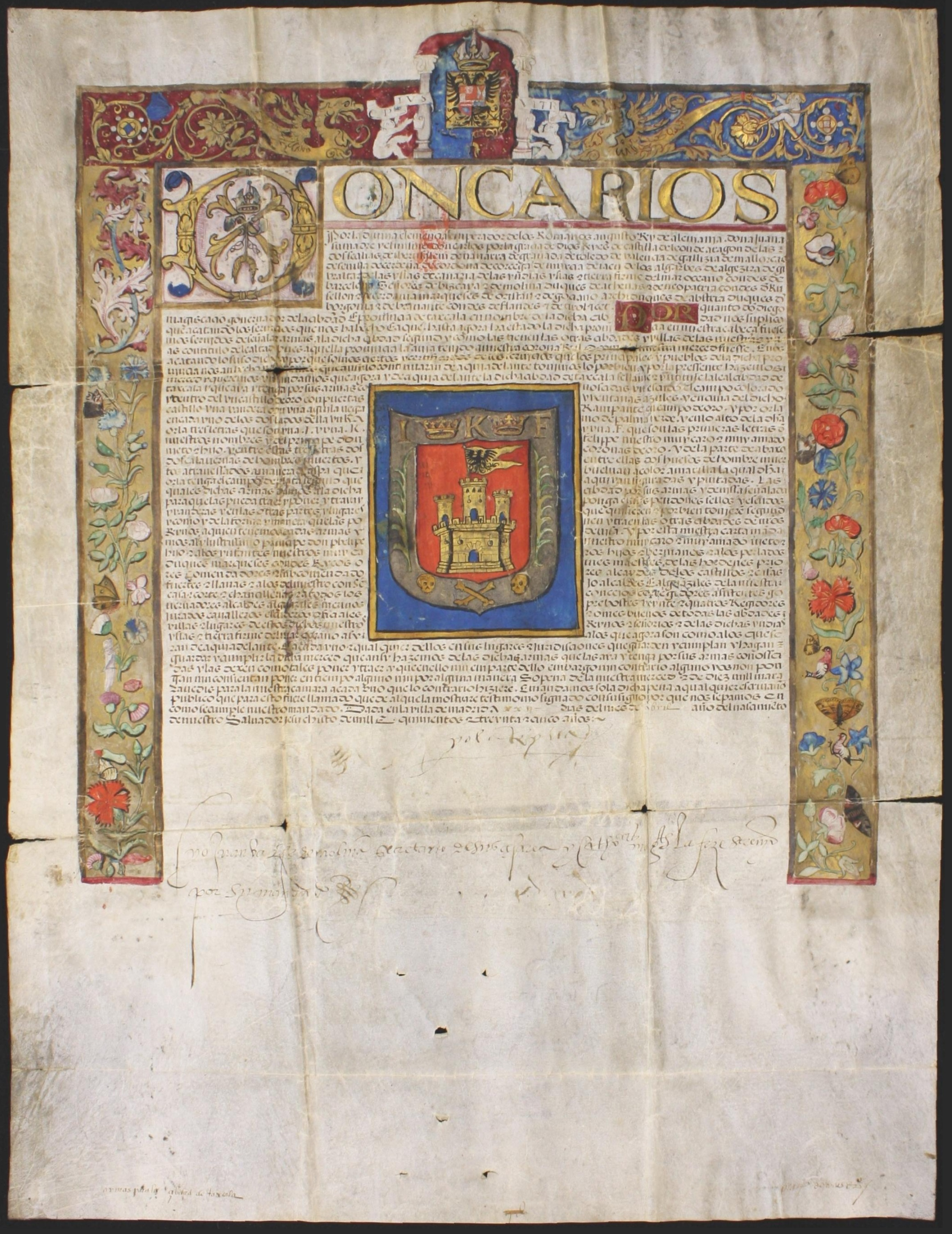
Royal Writ of the Foundation of the City of Tlaxcala.

The Royal Writ of the Foundation of the City of Tlaxcala, Mexico (in Spanish: Real cédula de la fundación de la ciudad de Tlaxcala, México) is the historical document issued by decree of Charles V on April 22, 1535, in Madrid, Spain, bestowing Tlaxcala the title of city. This was the first of three similar titles that the emperor granted to cities of the New Spain.

This document is determinant for the history of Tlaxcala because of the royal recognition for an indigenous province, where their inhabitants fought for their rights. This certificate was rescued and preserved by the CARSO Center for the Study of Mexican History.

== Historical context ==
During the Spanish conquest of the Aztec Empire, the Tlaxcaltecs were allies of Hernán Cortés, who organized the attack against Tenochtitlan in 1521. Because of their help, the Crown awarded them with canonries, rewards, and encomiendas. Tlaxcala was recognized by the Spanish Empire as a city of indigenous people, acquiring some privileges. Those acknowledgements were embodied in the certificate decreed by the monarch Charles V.

Diego Maxixcatzin, then indigenous governor of the Tlaxcala province, traveled to the Iberian Peninsula in 1543 to meet Charles V. The king granted Tlaxcala the title of Loyal City (Leal Ciudad) and its escutcheon, which remains to this day.
