= History of Tlaxcala =

Illustrated codex

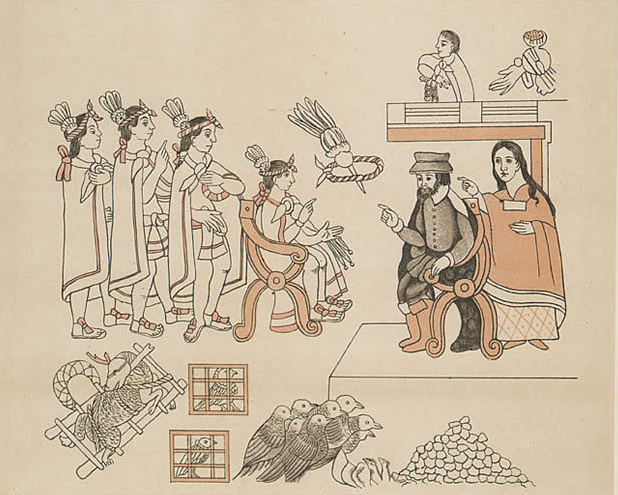
- Facsimile (c. 1890) of Lienzo de Tlaxcala. Hernán Cortés and La Malinche meet Moctezuma II in Tenochtitlan, November 8, 1519.
- Author: Diego Muñoz Camargo
- Original title: Historia de Tlaxcala
- Language: Nahuatl, Spanish
- Subject: religious, cultural, military
- Genre: Codex
- Published: c. 1585
- Publication place: Mexico

History of Tlaxcala (Spanish: Historia de Tlaxcala) is an alphabetic text in Spanish with illustrations written by and under the supervision of Diego Muñoz Camargo in the years leading up to 1585.

Muñoz Camargo's work is divided into three sections:

- "Relaciones Geográficas" or "Descripción de la ciudad y provincia de Tlaxcala", a Spanish text written by Camargo between 1581 and 1584 in response to Philip II of Spain's Relaciones Geográfica questionnaire.
- The "Tlaxcala Calendar", a largely pictorial section, with both Spanish and Nahuatl captions.
- The "Tlaxcala Codex" a largely pictorial section, with both Spanish and Nahuatl captions.

Another key source for Tlaxcalan history is the Lienzo de Tlaxcala, a colonial-era pictorial codex, produced in the second half of the sixteenth century. It was created at the request of the cabildo of the city of Tlaxcala. According to the information that is known about the document, three copies were produced, one of which would be sent to Spain as a present for King Charles V; the second copy would have been taken to Mexico City to be delivered to the viceroy and the last one would be guarded by the ark of the Tlaxcalan cabildo. These three copies are lost and the Lienzo is known only through a reproduction made in 1773 by Manuel de Ylláñez on the eighteenth-century lienzo is held by the municipal government of Tlaxcala.

== See also ==
- Aztec codices
- Lienzo de Quauhquechollan
