= Diego Muñoz Camargo =

- Born: 1529; Mexico
- Died: 1599 (aged 69–70); Mexico
- Occupation: Writer
- Writing career
- Language: Spanish
- Subject: History

Diego Muñoz Camargo (c. 1529 – 1599) was the author of History of Tlaxcala, an illustrated codex that highlights the religious, cultural, and military history of the Tlaxcaltec people.

== Life ==
Diego Muñoz Camargo was born in Spanish colonial Mexico of a Spanish father and Indian mother. His father was a conquistador. His birth date was 1528 or 1529.

He acted as official interpreter for the Spanish, particularly the Franciscans. He was also a chronicler of some note, belonging to a group of mestizo chroniclers with Fernando de Alva Cortés Ixtlilxóchitl and Fernando Alvarado Tezozómoc. His History of Tlaxcala, one version of a work of various forms, stands as an important source for Tlaxcala, in Mexico.

Muñoz Camargo was a businessman who entered into lucrative cross-cultural enterprises. He was able to do this since his father was one of the original Spanish conquistadors of Mexico. He was very active in other realms too. Besides business, he acted as a tutor for the Seminole peoples Alvar Nuñez Cabeza de Vaca brought to Mexico with him, he took urban Tlaxcalan peoples north to Chichimec country ostensibly to 'civilize' them, and he took a keen interest in the Spanish chronicles being composed which he inserted into a historical frame with Tlaxcalan tlacuilo manuscripts. This led him to become one of the first Spanish-language chroniclers of Tlaxcala.

== Bibliography ==
=== Primary Reference ===
- Muñoz Camargo, Diego. Historia de Tlaxcala (Ms. 210 de la Biblioteca Nacional de París).

=== Secondary Sources ===
- Leibsohn, Dana, and Barbara E. Mundy, "Reckoning with Mestizaje," Vistas: Visual Culture in Spanish America, 1520–1820 (2015).
- Mignolo, Walter D. "El mandato y la ofrenda: la Descripción de la ciudad y provincia de Tlaxcala, de Diego Muñoz Camargo, y las relaciones de Indias."
- Miller, Marilyn. "Covert Mestizaje and the Strategy of "Passing' in Diego Muñoz Camargo's Historia de Tlaxcala."
- Velazco, Salvador. Visiones de Anáhuac: reconstrucciones historiografías y etnicidades emergentes en el México colonial: Fernando de Alva Ixtlilxóchitl, Diego Muñoz Camargo y Hernando Alvarado Tezozómoc.
