= Quiahuiztlan =

Coordinates: 19.32575°N 98.23839°W

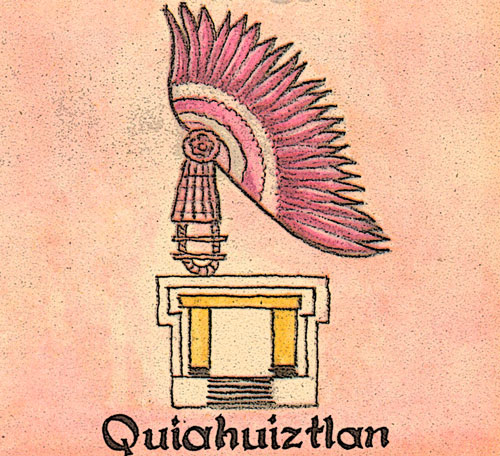
Glyph of Quiahuiztlan

Quiahuiztlan was one of the four altepetl (polities) that made up the confederation of Tlaxcala. It is located in the modern city of Tlaxcala, Tlaxcala State, Mexico.

== History ==
Quiahuiztlan in Tlaxcala State shares the same name as a settlement in modern Veracruz State that was occupied in the 16th century CE as part of the Totonac culture. The two places are unrelated. The Quiahuztlan in modern Veracruz State has temples, ballcourt, plazas and residences, which are built on artificial and natural terraces on the fairly high relief flanks of the mountain. The site is most-likely famous for its association with the Spanish conquistador Hernán Cortés.

Excavations conducted at Quiahuiztlan were conducted by Alfonso Medellín Zenil and Ramón Arellanos Melgarejo, from the Instituto Nacional de Antropología e Historia.

In the early 16th century, Quiahuiztlan in Tlaxcala State briefly seceded from the confederation, and replaced its Franciscan priests with Dominican ones. Quiahuiztlan subsequently rejoined Tlaxcala, but the possibility of a repeat secession continued to be used as a political threat.
