= Tecuelhuetzin =

- Malinche and Tecuelhuetzin in the Lienzo de Tlaxcala.

Princess of Tizatlan
- Born: 1501
- Died: 1537 (aged 35–36)
- Issue: Pedro de Alvarado y Xicohténcatl; Leonor de Alvarado y Xicohténcatl
- Father: Xicotencatl I

Tecuelhuetzin (1501-1537) was a Tlaxcaltec noblewoman. She was the daughter of Xicotencatl I, ruler of Tizatlan, who gave her in indigenous marriage to Spanish conquistador Pedro de Alvarado to seal their alliance with Hernán Cortés. She was baptized María Luisa Xicoténcatl and became part of his entourage until his death. Like La Malinche, she played a vital role in the Spanish conquests of Mesoamerica, acting as a translator and advisor. Her career spanned the modern countries of Mexico, Guatemala and Peru.

== Biography ==
In 1519, she was married along with four other Tlaxcallan princesses during the signing to the alliance between Spanish and Tlaxcaltecs. She was originally meant for Cortés himself, but as he was already married by the Christian rite, he chosed his lieutenant Pedro de Alvarado instead. She married him, while her sister Zacuancozcatl married Cristóbal de Olid. Tecuelhuetzin, now known by her Christian name Luisa or María Luisa Xicoténcatl, lent Alvarado her immense influence over the natives and her experience with local politics. She also acted as a translator for Cortés along with his own concubine La Malinche.

La Malinche, Luisa and four Tlaxcaltec noblewomen.

She formed part of the expedition to Tenochtitlan, and survived the Sad Night along with Malinche thanks to her Tlaxcaltec bodyguards. Afterwards she probably participated in the Siege of Tenochtitlan at Alvarado's side, given the presence of native women depicted with the Spanish captains in the battles of the Lienzo de Tlaxcala. She has been tentatively identified with one of the two native women in the scene of Teciquauhtitla.

After the fall of the Aztec Empire, she later followed Alvarado to the conquest of Guatemala. The journey was highly dangerous, and she gave birth to their daughter Leonor while in a military camp in unconquered territory in Utatlan in 1524. As her marriage to Alvarado was an indigenous ceremony, he later married Francisca de la Cueva by the Christian rite in 1528, but María Luisa remained in his inner circle. With the successive deaths of Francisca and his next wife Beatriz de la Cueva, she was ultimately the only of Alvarado's consorts he had offspring with. In 1534, she was again with Alvarado in his short expedition to Peru. She died three years later.

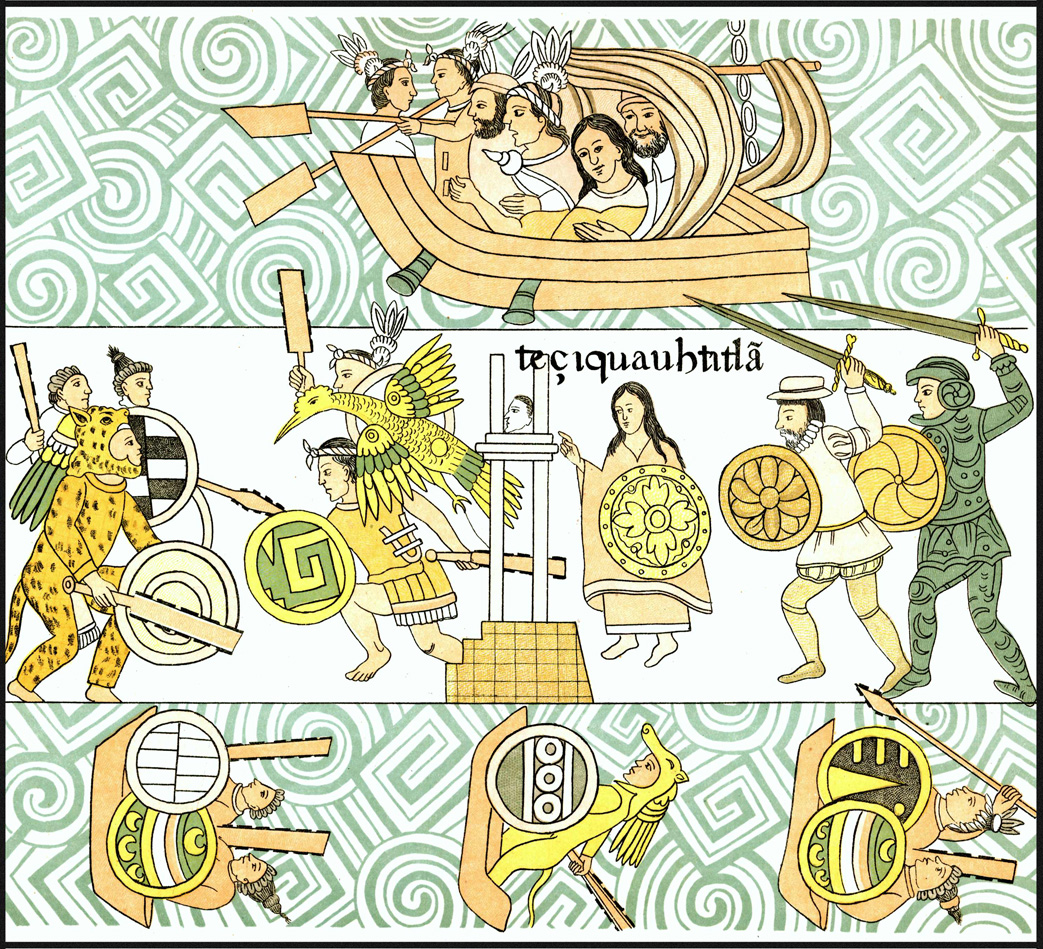
Native women in the siege of Tenochtitlan, possibly Malinche and María Luisa.

== Issue ==
She gave birth to their first child, Pedro de Alvarado y Xicoténcatl, in 1522 in Tutupec, but he died soon afterwards. She later gave birth to Leonor de Alvarado y Xicohténcatl, who became her parents' sole heir, in 1524 in Utatlan, Guatemala. A third child, named Diego or Francisco, is theorized to have been born some time later, but this is questioned.

== Bibliography ==
- Cossich Vielman, Margarita (2023). Princesas tlaxcaltecas, su palabra y su guerra. Universidad Autónoma Metropolitana. ISBN 9786073065528.
- Meade de Angulo, Mercedes (1992). Doña Luisa Teohquilhuastzin, mujer del capitán Pedro de Alvarado. Gobierno del Estado de Puebla.
- Matthew, Laura (2007). Indian Conquistadors: Indigenous Allies in the Conquest of Mesoamerica. University of Oklahoma Press.
- Sloan, Kathryin (2011). Women's Roles in Latin America and the Caribbean. ABC-Clio. p. 172-173. ISBN 9780313381096.
- Townsend, Camilla (2015). Malintzin: Una mujer indígena en la Conquista de México. Ediciones Era.
