= Chichimecatecuhtli =

Chichimecatecutli

Tlatoani of the Tlaxcaltecs
- Reign: Unknown
- Issue: Unnamed son

Chichimecatecuthli (fl. 1520) was a Tlaxcaltec nobleman and military man. He was a general of the armies of Tlaxcala during the Spanish conquest of the Aztec Empire, in which he first warred against Hernán Cortés before allying with him along with his people. He belonged possibly to the faction of Ocotelolco.

== Biography ==
According to Bernal Díaz del Castillo, Chichimecatecuhtli and Xicotencatl the Younger commanded the 50,000 Tlaxcaltec warriors who stopped the Spaniards and their Totonac allies before arriving to Tlaxcala in September 1519, believing them to be vassals to the Aztec Empire. He was in charge of a fifth of the contingent, which hailed from Huejotzingo, while the rest belonged to Xicohtencatl the Elder from Tizatlan, Maxixcatzin from Ocotelolco, Tlahuexolotzin from Tepeticpac and Tecapacaneca de Tepeyanco. The second day of the battle, due to their little success against the Spanish army despite their immense numbers advantage, Xicotencatl the Younger and a captain son to Chichimecatecuhtli accused each other of incompetence, causing a loss of authority for the former and the withdrawal in protest of the latter. After the lords of Tlaxcala accepted the peace offered by Cortés, Chichimecatecuhtli accompanied them to meet the conquistador.

After the Sad Night in July 1520, Chichimecatecuthli was again among the lords of Tlaxcala when they received Cortés after his disastrous escape from Tenochtitlan, the capital of the Aztec Empire. Inner turmoil burst when Xicotencatl the Younger called for wiping out the remaining Spaniards in exchange for peace with the new Aztec emperor Cuitlahuac, an idea plainly rejected by his father and the rest of the lords. Chichimecatecuhtli, still a political enemy of the youngster, discovered Xicotencatl's intention to carry on his plans and had him arrested and brought to the Tlaxcaltec senate. Xicotencatl tried to convince his father and the rest, for which he was attacked in a subsequent brawl in the senate and only escaped being executed due to the Elder's intervention.

After Maxixcatzin's death and the solidification of the Hispano-Tlaxcaltec counterattack against the Aztecs, Chichimecatecuhtli was appointed supreme general of Tlaxcala and joined Cortés with 10,000 warriors to conquer Tetzcoco, which would use as a naval base in the eponymous lake. Along with two captains Díaz calls Teulepile and Tiutical, he later escorted the workers who brought wood to build Spanish brigantines. Chichimecatecuthli expressed his irritation at being ordered to guard the convoy's rear guard, but he changed his mind upon learning Aztecs most often targeted that part, and also after he would have the chance to fight alongside Gonzalo de Sandoval, one of Cortés' lieutenants, who was popular among the Tlaxcaltecs due to his marriage with the princess Tolquequetzaltzin.

Chichimecatecuthli later served as a Cortés' second in command during the conquest of Xaltocan, and joined his circle during the siege of Tenochtitlan. His enemy Xicotencatl the Younger had been rehabilitated as a fellow captain of the forces, but he fled in order to stage a coup of Tlaxcala and capture Chichimecatecuhtli's lands behind his back, hoping to muster enough strength to change Tlaxcala's allegiance from Cortés to the Aztecs. Cortés was warned and sent envoys for the Younger, but when he refused to return, and under his own father's verdict, he was executed. Meanwhile, Chichimecatecuhtli remained a staunch supporter of the Spaniards even after most of the Indian allies withdrew due to a purported prophecy of Aztec victory, with only he, Ixtlilxochitl II and two other sons of Xicotencatl the Elder with their bodyguards remaining. The allies eventually returned after the prophecy proved false, brought by Tecapaneca.

After the total victory over Tenochtitlan, Chichimecatecuhtli and the rest of native captains returned to their lands with large amounts of cured human meat from their Aztec enemies to eat in their feasts.
