= Xicotencatl =

Xicotencatl or Xicohtencatl may refer to:

- Xicotencatl I, or Xicotencatl the Elder
- Xicotencatl II, or Xicotencatl the Younger
- Xicoténcatl, Tabasco, Mexico
- Xicoténcatl, Tamaulipas, Mexico
- Xicoténcatl National Park in Tlaxcala, Mexico
