= Xayacamach =

Xayacamach of Tizatlan was an Aztec poet from the Pre-Columbian state of Tlaxcallan, born between 1450 and 1455.

He was the son of the "Señor de Aztahua de Tizatlan" (Lord of Aztahua of Tizatlan). He took his father's place as governor, and assisted at the meeting called by Tecayehuatzin of Huextonzinco to converse on the meaning of "flower and song", which is where we get both of his recorded poems. Tecahueyatzin said of him:

A beautiful song is heard
Xayacamach Tlapeltuetzin raises it
these are his flowers

It is known that he died before the year 1500, because by this time his brother, Xicohtencatl, was the governor of the altepetl of Tizatlan. He sided with the Huastecs in their war with Mexica and was killed (Leon-Portilla and Shorris 670).

== Sources ==
- Leon-Portilla, Miguel (October 2000). Fifteen Poets of the Aztec World. Oklahoma: University of Oklahoma Press. pp. 225–227. 978-0806132914.
- Leon-Portilla, Miguel and Shorris, Earl. In the Language of Kings: An Anthology of Mesoamerican Literature--Pre-Columbian to the Present. W. W. Norton & Company (July 2001)
