= Indian auxiliaries =

Indigenous peoples of the Americas who aligned with the Spanish conquest

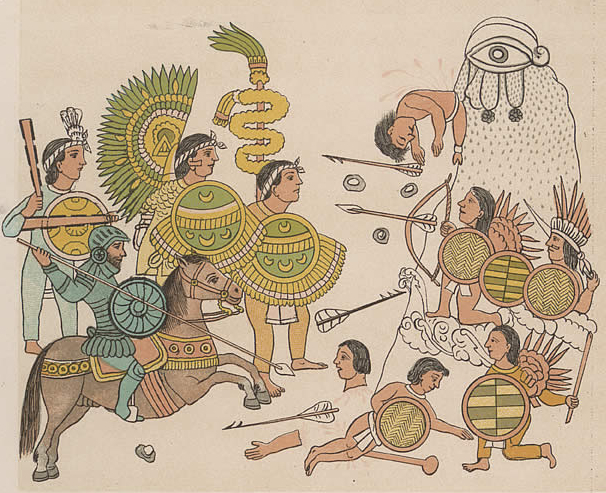
Tlaxcaltec auxiliaries (upper left) fighting alongside Cristóbal de Olid in his conquest of Jalisco, as depicted in the 16th century Lienzo de Tlaxcala

Indian auxiliaries, also known in the sources as indios amigos (lit. 'friendly Indians'), were those Indigenous peoples of the Americas who allied with Spain and fought alongside the conquistadors during the Spanish colonization of the Americas. These auxiliaries acted as guides, translators, soldiers, explorers and porters, often outnumbering peninsular Spaniards by enormous degrees in their military formations. During the Spanish conquest of the Inca Empire, Indigenous assistants were referred to by the Indigenous word yanakuna.

Indian auxiliaries continued to be used by the Spanish to maintain control over their colonies in the Americas; frequently stationed on the frontier, they were often used to suppress anti-colonial revolts such as Arauco War. Their important role in achieving the conquests of Spain gave birth to a modern Spanish-speaking idiom, la conquista la hicieron los indios ("the Indians did the conquest").

== History ==
The formations of auxiliary Indians arose commonly from alliances established by the Spaniards, exploiting ethnic and tribal antagonisms that they found during their occupation of the territory they were attempting to conquer. Vasco Núñez de Balboa and Hernán Cortés were among the first captains to strengthen their columns with these natives.

=== Mexico ===
During Hernán Cortés' campaign against the Aztecs from 1519 to 1521, he supplemented his meagre force of Spanish soldiers (numbering some 1,300) with hundreds of thousands of native auxiliaries, from various states such as Tlaxcala, Texcoco and Cholula. They were commanded by Chichimecatecuhtli and Ixtlilxochitl II from their respective factions.

During the final siege of the Aztec capital city of Tenochtitlan, Cortés, according to the account of one of his soldiers, Bernal Díaz del Castillo, had some 200,000 Tlaxcalan and other native auxiliaries, while the Aztec warriors drawn from the numerous cities surrounding Lake Xochimilco in the Valley of Mexico numbered more than 300,000.

=== Guatemala ===
The expedition of Pedro de Alvarado to Guatemala was composed of 480 Spaniards and thousands of auxiliary Indians from Tlaxcala, Cholula and other cities in central Mexico. In Guatemala the Spanish routinely fielded Indigenous allies; at first these were Nahua brought from the recently conquered Mexico, later they also included Maya. It is estimated that for every Spaniard on the field of battle, there were at least 10 native auxiliaries. Sometimes there were as many as 30 Indigenous warriors for every Spaniard, and it was the participation of these Mesoamerican allies that was particularly decisive. Some newly conquered Maya groups remained loyal to the Spanish once they had submitted to the conquest, such as the Tz'utujil and the K'iche' of Quetzaltenango, and provided them with warriors to assist further conquest.

In 1524, fresh from his victory over the Tz'utujil, Pedro de Alvarado led his army against the non-Maya Xinca of the Guatemalan Pacific lowlands. At this point Alvarado's force consisted of 250 Spanish infantry accompanied by 6,000 Indigenous allies, mostly Kaqchikel and Cholutec.

The Mam fortress of Zaculeu was attacked by Gonzalo de Alvarado y Contreras, brother of Pedro de Alvarado, in 1525, with 40 Spanish cavalry and 80 Spanish infantry, and some 2,000 Mexican and K'iche' allies. When the Spanish besieged the Ixil city of Nebaj in 1530, their Indigenous allies managed to scale the walls, penetrate the stronghold and set it on fire. Many defending Ixil warriors withdrew to fight the fire, which allowed the Spanish to storm the entrance and break the defences.

=== Peru and Chile ===
- During the siege of Cuzco, Francisco Pizarro had 200 Spaniards and 30,000 native Chankas, Huancas, Cañaris and Chachapoyas. The native contingents were commanded by chieftains Chilche and Vilchumlay, among others.
- The column of Diego de Almagro, who went into Chile, had 500 Spaniards, 100 African slaves and about 10,000 auxiliary Indians.
- In the case of the conquest of Chile by Pedro de Valdivia, the original group who left Cuzco included 11 Spaniards and 1,000 auxiliary Indians.

=== Philippines ===
- Indian auxiliaries were deployed during the Spanish conquest of the Philippines, including Tlaxcalan troops. Tlaxcalans also settled in the Philippines and mixed with the Tagalog indigenous society.

=== Colonial period after the conquest ===
After the initial conquest, most of these allies were considered less necessary and, sometimes, a liability. At times they were needed for defense of the extended Spanish Empire. They were incorporated into the military forces of the Empire, forming their own units, organised along European models under their own names, such as Compañías de Indios Nobles ("Companies of Noble Indians"). The necessity of defence came from either European threats like the Caribbean buccaneers and pirates or American threats such as the Chichimeca, Apache or Comanche tribes or the protracted Arauco War. These units fought in the independence wars.

== Composition and motivations of Native allied forces ==
The indigenous fighters who fought together with the Spaniards traced back from many city states, groups of people, and provinces across the Mesoamerican continent. These warriors had political, economic, and military reasons for forming an alliance with the Spanish. A group of those that came from city states at first opposed the Spaniards, others felt contested towards them, and others chose to be allies; each group made their own estimations based by their interests they had. The Totonacs, a group as an example to resonate were based upon being homage paying under Aztec authority during this era; resentment of problematic situations and being tired under Aztec rule switched them ally with the Spaniards to fight back against them.

In Mexico, the most effective and important allies were the Tlaxcalans. They had fought the Aztec Empire for decades and saw the Spaniards as a powerful asset to fight off the enemy. The same conflict would attract neighboring groups such as the Totonacs and the Huexotzinca, which provided men of war, scouting intelligence, and other war assets. The auxiliary factions would expand the Spanish fighting force by a large portion unit for various Spanish campaigns.

A similar case would happen in South America, Peru. When Francisco Pizarro landed in South America to go against the Inca Empire, he realized that many of these native groups who had been conquered by the Incas chose to support the Spanish due to rivalry and wanted to get back in revenge to what was lost for them. The Spaniards were then supplied thousands of indigenous combatants to help bring down Incas. Historian Matthew Restall states that the Spaniards depended a lot on Native support during their campaigns.

The goals of the auxiliaries depended based on their interest. A lot of these indigenous wanted to escape their personal debts while others just wanted to gain access to wealth by supporting the new rulers. All of these indigenous factions that participated in the campaigns shared a commonality, they all wanted to fight their rival group that had oppressed them for so long.

== Treatment and outcomes of Native auxiliaries after conquest ==
The aftermath of the conquest brought different outcomes for each Indigenous faction who sided with the Spaniards. A few of them received various types of grants, were given the reduction of tribal obligations, and were given the access to higher social status within the new hierarchy. Unfortunately, not all auxiliary factions were enabled such grants like they were promised. Historian James Lockhart argues that many Native warriors who sided with the Spaniards in South America, Peru received less rewards for their service, and their contributions in the campaigns were dismissed by the colonial authorities.

Following the downfall of the Aztec Empire, a similar case was seen in Mexico. The Tlaxcalans, who were one of Spain's fiercest auxiliary faction expected vast recognition for their values to the Spanish campaigns. They were granted some rights and a couple of land at first; over time, these same privileges were reduced and dismissed as Spanish colonialism became bigger in the North American provinces. Historian Hugh Thomas goes over that these rewards given to these auxiliary factions were temporary and failed to align to the important sacrifice of their values they've brought in the Spanish campaigns.

The promise and the delivery introduced complicated terms as colonialism continued in North America. As Spain secured more land over time, the auxiliary factions became useless. Lockhart points out in an instance where indigenous warriors who captured Inca emperor Atahualpa were given no recognition compared to regular Spanish infantrymen despite taking place in the same event. Many of these auxiliaries didn't realize that being rivals towards other indigenous groups benefited the Spaniards in the long run as they've noticed the strains of old rivalries; the encouragement of persuading these groups to fight each other made it easy to continue the campaigns.

== See also ==
- United States Army Indian Scouts
- Sepoy
- Imbangala
- Indios reyunos
- Inca army
- Aztec warfare
- Malinchism
- Hispanics in the Roman army
