= Xicotencatl I =

Xicotencatl
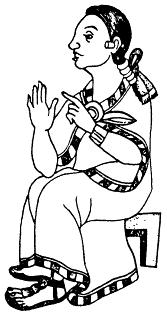
- Xicotencatl in the Lienzo de Tlaxcala

Tlatoani of Tizatlan
- Reign: ? - 1522
- Predecessor: Xayacamach
- Successor: Xicotencatl II
- Born: c. 11 House (1425)
- Died: c. 4 Rabbit (1522)
- Issue: Xicotencatl II; María Luisa Xicoténcatl; Lucía Xicoténcatl
- Father: Aztahua

Xicotencatl I or Xicotencatl the Elder (c. 11 House (1425) – c. 4 Rabbit (1522)) was a long-lived teuctli (elected official) of Tizatlan, a Nahua altepetl (city-state) within the Confederacy of Tlaxcala, in what is now Mexico. He was instrumental in allying the Tlaxcalteca with the Spanish in order to overthrow the former's long-time foe, the Aztec Empire; afterward, he converted to Christianity under the name of Lorenzo Xicotencatl or Don Lorenzo de Vargas.

== Etymology ==
His Nahuatl name, pronounced [ʃiːkoʔˈteːŋkatɬ], is sometimes spelled Xicohtencatl.

== Early life ==
At the time of the Spanish conquest of the Aztec Empire he was very old, and in poor health. He was nevertheless instrumental in aligning the Tlaxcalteca with Hernán Cortés' Spaniards. Tlaxcalan historian Diego Muñoz Camargo wrote of him that he was more than 120 years old and could only see Cortés if he had someone lift his eyelids for him; Muñoz Camargo also writes that he had more than 500 wives and concubines, and—consequently—a large number of children, including Xicotencatl II and the wife of Jorge de Alvarado, Doña Lucía.

== Conquest of the Aztec Empire ==
The arrival of Hernán Cortés and the Spaniards divided the Tlaxcalan senate. Chronicler Francisco Cervantes de Salazar records that while Maxixcatl was open to allying with the Spanish, Xicotencatl's son—Xicotencatl II—was skeptical, holding that their presence was too dangerous:

[...] does Maxixcatzin deem these people gods, who seem more like ravenous monsters thrown up by the intemperate sea to blight us, gorging themselves on gold, silver, stones, and pearls; sleeping in their own clothes; and generally acting in the manner of those who would one day make cruel masters [...] There are barely enough chickens, rabbits, or corn-fields in the entire land to feed their bottomless appetites, or those of their ravenous ‘deer’ [the Spanish horses]. Why would we—who live without servitude, and never acknowledged a king—spill our blood, only to make ourselves into slaves?

After this speech, members of the council were divided on how to proceed, and Temilotecatl suggested a synthesized plan of allowing Xicotencatl II and some Otomi troops to ambush Cortés, the outcome of the attack to determine the course of action. After the Tlaxcalteca were defeated, Tlaxcala accepted an alliance with Cortés. Bernal Castillo records Xicotencatl I's speech on the matter:

Our wizards and soothsayers and priests have told us what they think about the persons of these Teules, and that they are very valiant. It seems to me that we should seek to be friends with them, and in either case, whether they be men or Teules, that we should make them welcome, and that four of our chieftains should set out at once and take them plenty to eat, and should offer them friendship and peace, so that they should assist us and defend us against our enemies, and let us bring them here to us, and give them women, so that we may have relationship with their offspring, for the ambassadors whom they have sent to treat for peace, tell us that they have some women with them.

The Tlaxcalteca handed over 300 slave women, who were freed, baptized and assigned by Cortés as handmaidens for his concubine and advisor La Malinche. After learning that the women were well-treated, the lords of Tlaxcala married off five of their own daughters to the Spaniards. Xicotencatl's daughter Tecuelhuetzin married Pedro de Alvarado, being thence baptized as María Luisa Xicohténcatl.

Díaz del Castillo recounts that when Xicotencatl the Younger plotted to seize Chichimecatecuhtli's lands in Tlaxcala, during the latter's absence for the Siege of Tenochtitlan, Xicotencatl I told Cortés that "his son was wicked and he would not vouch for him, and begg[ed] Cortés to kill him." This Cortés ordered, and Xicotencatl II was hanged. The Tlaxcalan-Spanish alliance succeeded in overthrowing the Aztec Empire in 1521, and Xicotencatl died the following year.

== After the conquest ==
After Spanish control over Tenochtitlan was established, Xicotencatl resumed. By his petition, one of his sons was sent with two other Tlaxcaltec noblemen as an embassy to King Charles I of Spain in Europe. He died in 1522. Following his death, noblemen from the rival Tlaxcallan city-state of Ocotelolco took control of the confederacy.

His daughter María Luisa gave birth to Pedro de Alvarado's children, Pedro and Leonor Alvarado Xicohténcatl. His great-grandson Captain Don Joaquin Buenaventura de la Paz was the founder of the Tlaxcalan settlement of San Esteban de Nueva Tlaxcala near Saltillo, Coahuila, Mexico in the year 1591.

== Poetry ==
One song or poem attributed to Xicotencatl is known. It is recorded in the Cantares mexicanos (fols. 57v.–58r.), a collection of Nahuatl songs probably compiled in the last third of the 16th century for Bernardino de Sahagún, and concerns the flower wars conducted between Tlaxcala and the states of the Aztec Triple Alliance.

== See also ==
- Spanish conquest of the Aztec Empire
- Xicotencatl II

== Notes ==
Preceded by Xayacamach	Tlatoani of Tizatlan	Succeeded by
