= La conquista la hicieron los indios y la independencia los españoles =

"La conquista la hicieron los indios y la independencia los españoles" ("The Indians did the conquest and the Spaniards the independence") is an idiom of the modern Spanish-speaking world, of disputed authorship, about the history of Hispanic America. Its meaning reflects how the Spanish conquest of America was largely carried out by Indian auxiliaries in the service of the Spanish Empire, rather than by Spaniards themselves. On the other hand, in the Spanish American wars of independence, the patriota or rebel side was mainly driven and composed by Criollo people, Spaniards born in the Americas, often at the expense of the native or mestizo populations.

== History ==
The idea expressed is not modern, and was acknowledged since the conquest's own times, in the 16th century. Jesuit and writer José de Acosta codified it in 1590 in his work Historia natural y moral de las Indias:

It was the Lord's providence that, when the first Spaniards arrived, they found help in the Indian themselves, because there were factions and great divisions... In New Spain it is not any less known that the help of the province of Tlaxcala, by the perpetual enmity they had with the Mexicans, gave the Marquis Don Hernán Cortés and his people victory and lordship over México, and without them it would have been impossible to prevail, not even settle in the land.

In 1963, Cristóbal L. Mendoza, grandson of the first Venezuelan president Cristóbal Mendoza, mentions the quote «la conquista la hicieron los indios y la independencia los españoles» as belonging to Mexican writer Carlos Pereyra (1871–1942). For historians José Luis Martínez and Jaime Montell, it is a quote of Mexican historian Arturo Arnaiz y Freg (1915–1980). Esteban Mira Caballos gives it to Mexican historian José Vasconcelos (1882–1959), although he believes its popularization came from Pereyra. Marcelo Gullo also attributes it to Vasconcelos.

== Sources ==
- Fazio Fernández, Mariano (2009). La América ingenua. Rialp. ISBN 9788432139840.
- Montell García, Jaime (2001). La conquista de México-Tenochtitlán. Porrúa. ISBN 9789707011489.
- Gómez Maganda, Alejandro (1963). ¡Como dice el dicho! Refranes y dichos mexicanos, tomo 2. ECO.
- Mendoza Aguerrevere, Cristóbal Lorenzo (1963). Temas de historia americana ...: Informes, discursos, prólogos. Universidad de Michigan.
- Pérez Vejo, Tomás (2024). México, la nación doliente. Imágenes profanas para una historia sagrada. Universidad de Zaragoza. ISBN 9788413408910.
