= Fall of Tenochtitlan =

1521 conquest of the Aztec capital by the Spanish Empire and rival indigenous tribes

Coordinates: 19.435°N 99.131°W

- Part of the Spanish conquest of the Aztec Empire
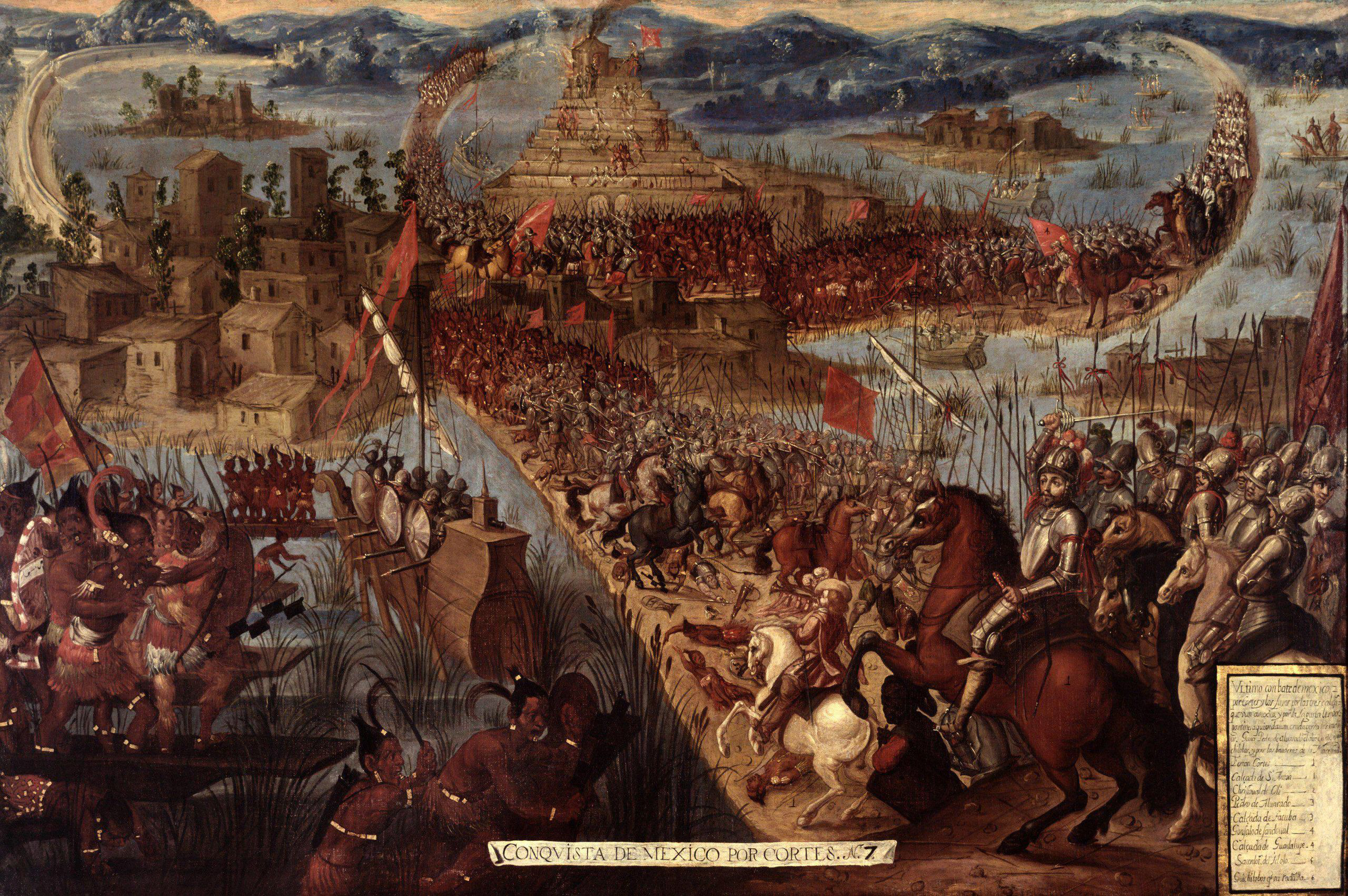
- "Conquista de México por Cortés". An Unknown artist, second half of the 17th century. Library of Congress, Washington, DC.
Date	May 26 – August 13, 1521 (2 months, 2 weeks and 4 days)
Location	Tenochtitlan, present-day Mexico City, Mexico
Result	Spanish and Tlaxcaltec victory; Fall of the Mexica
Territorial changes	Creation of the Kingdom of New Spain

Belligerents
Spanish Empire (Governorate of Cuba); Confederacy of Tlaxcala; Tetzcoco; Otomis; Chalco; Mixquic; Huejotzingo; Iztapalapa	Mexica: Tenochtitlan; Tlatelolco

Commanders and leaders
Hernán Cortés; Gonzalo de Sandoval; Pedro de Alvarado; Cristóbal de Olid; Chichimecatecuhtli; Xicotencatl II (executed); Ixtlilxochitl II	Cuauhtémoc (POW); Coanacoch (POW)

Strength
900–1,300 Spanish infantry 86 cavalry 16 cannons 13 lake brigantines 50,000–200,000 Native allies	80,000 warriors 400 war canoes

Casualties and losses
450–860 Spanish; 20,000 Natives	100,000 killed in action 300 war canoes sunk At least 40,000 Aztecs civilians killed and captured, other sources claim 100,000 to 240,000 were killed in the campaign overall including warriors and civilians

The fall of Tenochtitlan, the capital of the Mexica, was an important event in the Spanish conquest of the Mexica. It occurred in 1521 following extensive negotiations between local factions and Spanish conquistador Hernán Cortés. He was aided by La Malinche, his interpreter and companion, and by thousands of indigenous allies, especially Tlaxcaltec warriors.

Although numerous battles were fought between the Mexica and the Spanish-led coalition, which was composed mainly of Tlaxcaltec men, it was the siege of Tenochtitlan that directly led to the fall of the Aztec civilization and the ensuing sacking and violence against the survivors. The indigenous population at the time was devastated due to a smallpox epidemic, which killed much of its leadership. Because smallpox had been endemic in Spain for centuries, the Spanish had developed an acquired immunity and were affected relatively little in the epidemic.

The conquest of the Mexica was a critical stage in the Spanish colonization of the Americas.

== Early events ==
=== Cortés goes to Tenochtitlan ===
In April 1519, Hernán Cortés, a nobleman recently landed in present-day Cuba and the leader of the third Spanish expedition to the coast of what is now known as Mexico, landed at San Juan de Ulúa, a high-quality harbour on Mexico's east coast, with 508 soldiers, 100 sailors, and 14 small cannons. (Survivors of the previous two expeditions directed him to this harbour.) Diego Velázquez de Cuéllar, the Governor of Cuba, called for Cortés to lead an expedition into Mexico after favourable reports from two previous expeditions to Yucatán caught the interest of the Spanish in Cuba. Under pressure by his relatives, who had a different leader in mind, Velázquez revoked Cortés's mandate to lead the expedition before the man left Cuba. Thus Cortés had to struggle to persist as expedition leader while still in Cuba; twice messengers from Velázquez arrived to depose him, and twice they were dissuaded from executing their mission. After Cortés sailed, Velázquez sent an army led by Pánfilo de Narváez to take him into custody.

But after reaching Mexico, Cortés used the same legal tactic as had been used by Governor Velázquez when he invaded Cuba years before: he created a local government and had himself elected as the magistrate. He was thus theoretically responsible only to the King of Spain. Cortés followed this tactic when he and his men established the city of Villa Rica de la Vera Cruz, also known as Veracruz, seven miles from the harbour of San Juan de Ulúa on the east coast of the area. An inquiry into Cortés' action was conducted in Spain in 1529 and no action was taken against him.

Cortés happened to land at the borders of Cempoala, a vassal state to the Aztecs that had many grievances against them. As he encountered several polities who resented Aztec rule, Cortés told them he had arrived on orders of his Emperor to improve conditions, abolish human sacrifices, teach the locals the true faith, and "stop them from robbing each other". He was successful in enforcing excellent behaviour by his army when among potential allies. Cortés clashed with some of these polities, among them the Totonac and Tlaxcalan. The latter gave him two battles during the day and one at night, and kept up a strong defence, holding off his army on a hilltop for two weeks. His numerically inferior force finally triumphed when the Tlaxcalan began to consider his ceaseless offers of peace. Notably Xicotencatl the Elder wanted to form an alliance with the Spaniards against the Aztecs, which was the goal of Cortés as well.

It once was widely believed that the Aztecs first thought Cortés was Quetzalcoatl, a mythical god prophesied to return to Mexico—coincidentally in the same year Cortés landed and from the same direction he came. This is now believed to have been a myth of the conquerors, and perhaps of natives who wished to rationalize the actions of the Aztec tlatoani, Moctezuma II. Most scholars agree that the Aztecs, especially the inner circle around Moctezuma, did not believe that Cortés was a god in any shape or form. Messages between Cortés and Moctezuma, however, frequently allude to the legend, which was widely known across the Aztec dominions to both Aztecs and their subjects. It strongly influenced them, as Bernal Díaz del Castillo repeatedly attests.

Moctezuma sent a group of noblemen and other emissaries to meet Cortés at Quauhtechcac. These emissaries brought golden jewellery as a gift, which greatly pleased the Spaniards. According to the Florentine Codex, Lib. 12, f.6r., Moctezuma also ordered his messengers to carry the highly symbolic penacho (headdress) of Quetzalcoatl de Tula to Cortés and place it on him. As news about the strangers reached the capital city, Moctezuma became increasingly fearful and considered fleeing the city. He reportedly resigned himself to what he considered to be the fate of his people.

Cortés continued on his march toward Tenochtitlan. Before entering the city, on November 8, 1519, Cortés and his troops prepared for battle by armoring themselves and their horses, and arranging into military rank with four leading horsemen followed by five contingents of foot soldiers. The contingents had iron swords and wooden or leather shields; horsemen in cuirasses, armed with iron lances, swords, and wooden shields; crossbowmen; more horsemen; soldiers armed with arquebus guns; and lastly, indigenous soldiers from Tlaxcalan, Tliliuhquitepec, and Huexotzinco armed with cotton armor and shields and crossbows, many of whom carried provisions in baskets or bundles or escorted the cannons on wooden carts.

Cortés's army entered the city on the flower-covered causeway from Iztapalapa, associated with the god Quetzalcoatl. Cortés was amicably received by Moctezuma. The captive woman Malinalli Tenépal, also known as Doña Marina, translated from Nahuatl to Chontal Maya; the Spaniard Gerónimo de Aguilar translated from Chontal Maya to Spanish.

There were numerous instances of miscommunication, specifically regarding the first interaction between Cortes and Moctezuma. There were also variations in the different accounts of this first contact specifically between the accounts of Cortes and Bernal Díaz. As there was a difference in the accounts regarding whether or not Cortes was able to touch Moctezuma when they first met. Doña Marina also was not always accurate in her translation, as her primary objectives were to avoid war, and also obtain gold, which was promised to her by Cortes. This led to Marina and Jeronimo De Aguilar having numerous instances of miscommunication, which led to numerous different accounts of the interaction between the Spaniards and the Aztecs in Tenochtitlan.

The Spanish soon took Moctezuma hostage on November 14, 1519, as a safety measure because they were so outnumbered by the Aztec. Secondly they learned that Moctezuma had heard from a messenger, a few days before Cortes, that at least eight hundred more Spaniards in thirteen great ships had arrived on the coast. Cortés had been communicating to the Crown that he already had control of the territory and was practically running the city of Tenochtitlan. He was at risk of having his commission revoked, because the vast new Spanish forces were sent by his enemy Diego Velázquez. If they competed for power, they could have ended his campaign in Mexico and might have doomed the try for a lightning conquest.

Cortés attempted to take Moctezuma hostage in an effort to ensure his cooperation. According to all eyewitness accounts, Moctezuma initially refused to leave his palace but after a series of threats from and debates with the Spanish captains, and assurances from Doña Marina, he agreed to move with his retinue to the Axayáctal palace. The first captain assigned to guard him was Pedro de Alvarado. Other Aztec lords were also detained by the Spanish, when they started questioning the authority of their captive tlatoani. The palace was surrounded by over 100 Spanish soldiers in order to prevent any attempt at rescue.

=== Tensions mount between Aztecs and Spaniards ===
It is uncertain why Moctezuma cooperated with the Spaniards. It is possible he feared losing his life or political power; however, one of the effective threats wielded by Cortés was the destruction of the city in the case of fighting between Spaniards and Aztecs (which ultimately came to pass). This Moctezuma at all costs wanted to avoid, vacillating and deferring the rupture until this policy claimed his life. From the perspective of the tlatoani, the Spaniards might have been assigned some decisive role by fate. It could also have been a tactical move: Moctezuma may have wanted to gather more information on the Spaniards, or to wait for the end of the agricultural season and strike at the beginning of the war season. However, he did not carry out either of these actions even though high-ranking military leaders such as his brother Cuitlahuac and nephew Cacamatzin urged him to do so.

With Moctezuma as his captive, Cortés did not need to worry about being cut off from supplies or being attacked, although some of his captains had such concerns. He also assumed that he could control the Aztecs through Moctezuma. However, Cortés had little knowledge of the ruling system of the Aztecs; Moctezuma was not all-powerful as Cortés imagined. Being appointed to and maintaining the position of tlatoani was based on the ability to rule decisively; he could be replaced by another noble if he failed to do so. At any sign of weakness, Aztec nobles within Tenochtitlan and in other Aztec tributaries were liable to rebel. As Moctezuma complied with orders issued by Cortés, such as commanding tribute to be gathered and given to the Spaniards, his authority was slipping, and quickly his people began to turn against him.

Cortés and his army were permitted to stay in the Palace of Axayacatl, and tensions continued to grow. While the Spaniards were in Tenochtitlan, Velázquez assembled a force of nineteen ships, more than 1400 soldiers with twenty cannons, eighty horsemen, one-hundred and twenty crossbowmen, and eighty arquebusiers under the command of Pánfilo de Narváez to capture Cortés and return him to Cuba. Velázquez felt that Cortés had exceeded his authority, and had been aware of Cortés's misconduct for nearly a year. He had to wait for favorable winds, though, and was unable to send any forces until spring. Narváez's troops landed at San Juan de Ulúa on the Gulf of Mexico coast around April 20, 1520.

After Cortés became aware of their arrival, he left Pedro de Alvarado in charge in Tenochtitlan with 80 soldiers, and brought all his forces (about two hundred and forty men) by quick marches to Narváez's camp in Cempohuallan on May 27. Several negotiations between the two Spaniards took place on the way, in which Cortés was able to persuade many important people in Narváez's camp to take his side. Cortés attacked Narváez's camp late at night; his men, much superior in experience and organization, wounded Narváez in the eye and quickly took him as a hostage; also taken were his principal adherents, de Salvatierra and Diego Velasquez (the nephew of the Governor of Cuba). Evidence suggests that the two were in the midst of negotiations at the time, and Narváez was not expecting an attack. Cortés then finished winning over Narváez's captains with promises of the vast wealth in Tenochtitlan, persuading them to follow him back to the Aztec capital. Narváez was imprisoned in Vera Cruz, and his army was integrated into Cortés's forces.

== Rapid deterioration of relations ==
=== Massacre at the festival of Tóxcatl ===
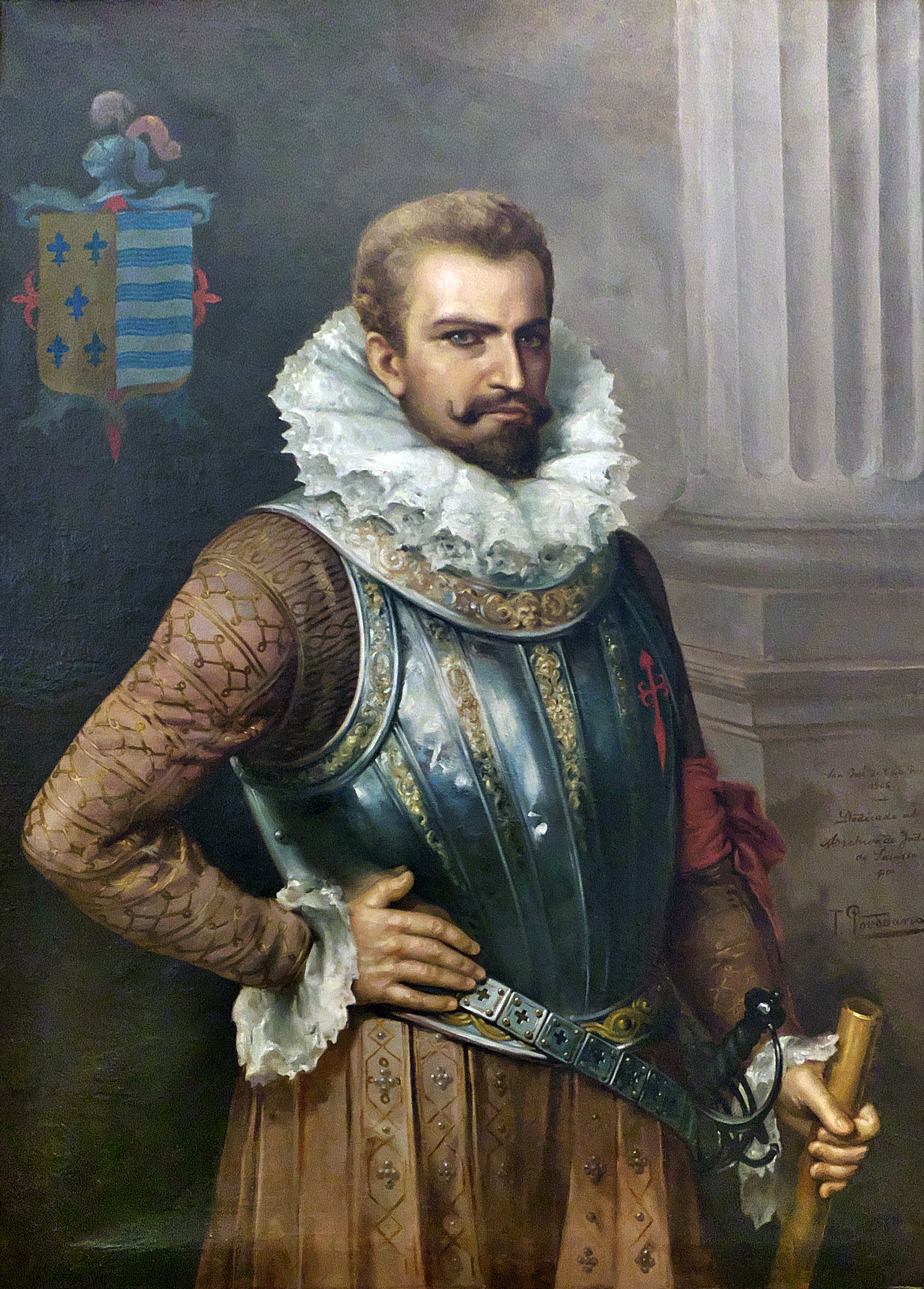
Conquistador Pedro de Alvarado.

During Cortés's absence, Pedro de Alvarado was left in command in Tenochtitlan with 80 soldiers.

At this time, the Mexica (Aztecs) began to prepare for the annual festival of Toxcatl in early May, in honor of Tezcatlipoca, otherwise known as the Smoking Mirror or the Omnipotent Power. They honored this god during the onset of the dry season so that the god would fill dry streambeds and cause rain to fall on crops. Moctezuma secured the consent of Cortés to hold the festival, and again confirmed permission with Alvarado.

Alvarado was commissioned by Cortés to take over his post and to foresee everything related to interactions among Spaniards and the Mexica, right at the time when the Toxcatl festival was to occur. Cortés expressly instructed Alvarado not to perform any military action during his absence. Alvarado, however, had an unstable temperament and inquired where the nobility's gold was stored.

He tortured priests and nobles and discovered that the Aztecs were planning a revolt. Losing control over events, he sequestered Moctezuma and increased the guards around the tlatoani.

By the day of the festival, twenty days after Cortés' departure, the Aztecs had gathered on the Patio of Dances. Alvarado had sixty of his men as well as many of his Tlaxcalan allies stationed in positions around the patio. The Aztecs initiated the Serpent Dance. The euphoric dancing as well as the accompanying flute and drum playing disturbed Alvarado; he suspected the potential for revolt. He ordered the gates closed and killed many thousands of Aztec nobles, warriors and priests.

Alvarado, the conquistadors and the Tlaxcalans retreated to their base in the Palace of Axayacatl and secured the entrances. Alvarado ordered his men to shoot their cannons, crossbows, and arquebuses into the gathering crowd. The result either preempted or triggered the Aztec revolt, which was, however, inevitable from the moment of Moctezuma's capture and was accelerated by the split of the Spanish forces. Alvarado forced Moctezuma to appeal to the crowd outside the Palace and this appeal temporarily calmed them.

The massacre had the result of resolutely turning all the Aztecs against the Spanish and completely undermining Moctezuma's authority.

=== Aztec revolt ===
Alvarado sent word to Cortés of the events, and Cortés hurried back to Tenochtitlan on June 24 with 1,300 soldiers, 96 horses, 80 crossbowmen, and 80 arquebusiers. Cortés also came with 2,000 Tlaxcalan warriors on the journey. Cortés entered the palace unscathed, as the hostilities had not started yet, although the Aztecs had probably planned to ambush him. The Aztecs had already stopped sending food and supplies to the Spaniards. They became suspicious and watched for people trying to sneak supplies to them; many innocent people were slaughtered because they were suspected of helping them. A few days after the great forces of Cortés got into Tenochtitlan, the roads were shut and the causeway bridges were raised. The Aztecs halted any Spanish attacks or attempts to leave the palace. Every Spanish soldier that was not killed was wounded.

Cortés failed to grasp the full extent of the situation, as the attack on the festival was the last straw for the Aztecs, who now were completely against Moctezuma and the Spanish. The military gains of the attack therefore had a serious political cost for Cortés. His new followers were greatly disturbed at the power of the Aztecs, and held Cortés to be a liar since nobody revered them and brought them food and gifts as Cortés had promised.

Cortés attempted to parlay with the Aztecs, and after this failed he sent Moctezuma to tell his people to stop fighting. However, the Aztecs refused. The Spanish asserted that Moctezuma was stoned to death by his own people as he attempted to speak with them. Three stones hit him, one of them on the head, so cerebral hematoma is possible. Moctezuma refused all medical help as well as food, and died soon after the attack. The Aztecs later claimed that Moctezuma had been murdered by the Spanish. Two other local rulers were found strangled as well. Moctezuma's younger brother Cuitláhuac, who had been ruler of Ixtlapalapan until then, was chosen as the Tlatoani.

Initially, Cortés resolved to fight the Aztec troops opposed to him and win the city in direct conflict. This stemmed from three errors of judgment:

1. Underestimation of the Aztecs. Cortés fought the Tabascans, the Cempoalans, the Tlaxcalans and found them strong opponents, but always prevailed. He had never fought an Aztec army before and did not expect such resolve and martial skill as he encountered – although all his previous foes warned that the Aztecs were the greatest warriors they had ever seen and could not be withstood within their city.

2. Overrating his forces. Since Cortés won all his battles in Mexico before this while at the head of much inferior forces, being in charge of a nearly full Spanish tercio must have made him feel invincible. In fact, the only serviceable portion of his army were his old followers with great experience of Aztec warfare, who were by this time severely whittled down by wounds and disease. The newly arrived Narvaéz's men did not have experience in local fighting and eventually perished in much greater numbers than the veterans.

3. Unprepared for enemy tactics. The Aztecs had fought for the lake cities many times before and their tactics were excellent - the use of canoes, the use of flat roofs with prepared missiles, dropping down into the lake when cornered, and destroying bridges. Cavalry could not operate in these conditions and control of the water was crucial, which Cortés did not realize at first.

With this mindset, Cortés launched an attack directly at the chief temple of the city, the Cue of Huichilopotzli. In spite of determined opposition, the Spanish push got them to the top of the temple's 114 steps, but at a great loss. Cortés aimed at routing the Aztecs and by holding both Moctezuma and the great temple - being able to offer peace once again. However, the Spanish attack encountered such fierce resistance and numerous fatalities among his men, that the plan fell apart. The retreat to Spanish quarters was as hard as the attack, and part of their quarters were plundered in the meantime. The direct loss of nearly a hundred men dead and the fierce spirit of the Aztecs who refused to be cowed by his ascent of the temple convinced Cortés that a night escape was now his only option for survival.

=== La Noche Triste and the Spanish flight to Tlaxcala ===
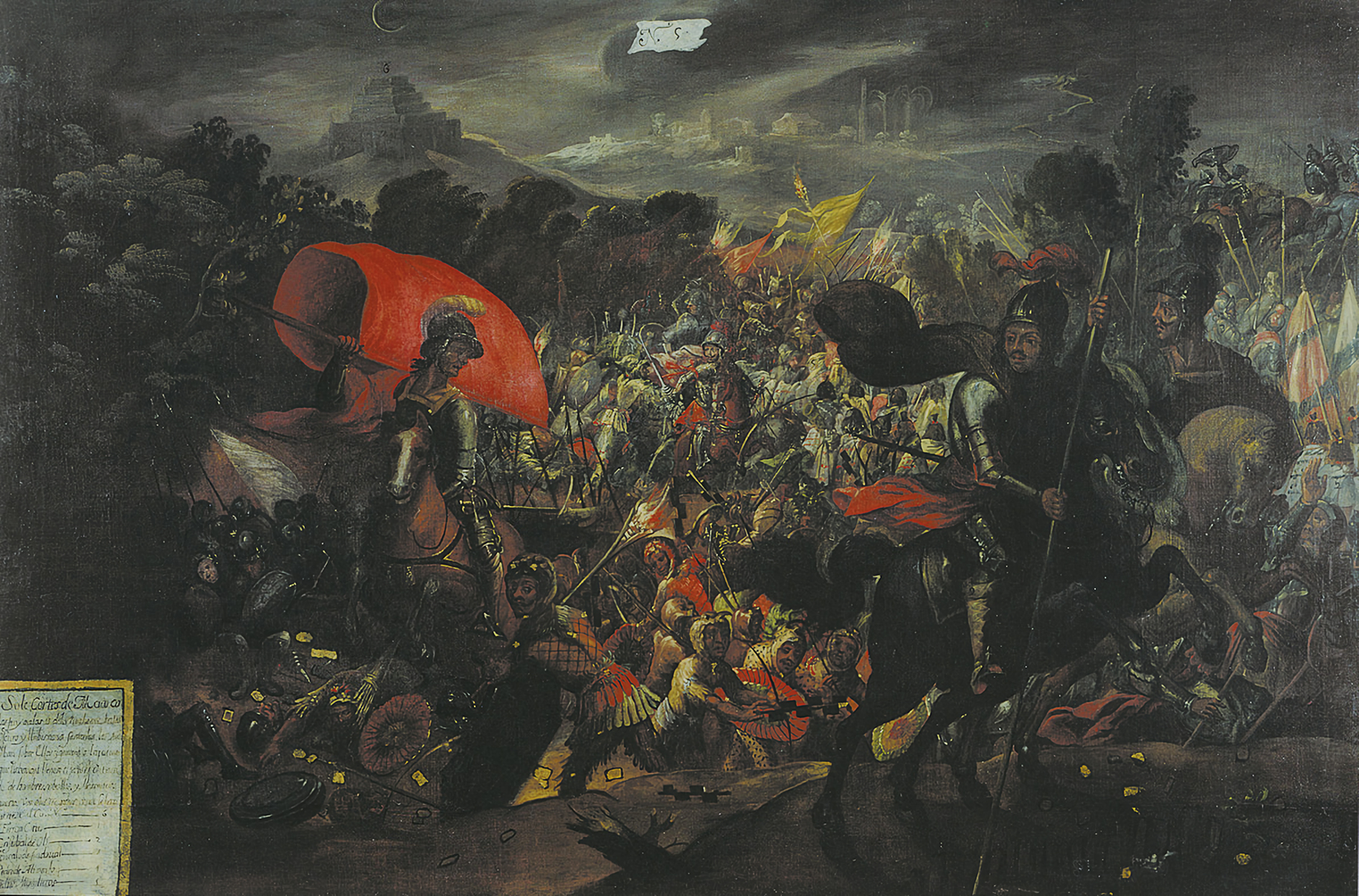
La Noche Triste – The Sad Night

The flight of the Spanish from Tenochtitlan was a crushing setback for Cortés, and his army came just short of annihilation. It is still remembered as "La Noche Triste," The Night of Sorrows. Popular tales say Cortés wept under a tree the night of the massacre of his troops at the hands of the Aztecs.

Though a flight from the city would make Cortés appear weak before his indigenous allies, it was this or death for the Spanish forces. Cortés and his men, in the center of the city of Tenochtitlan, would most likely have to fight their way out, no matter what direction they took.

Cortés wanted to flee to Tlaxcala, so a path directly east would have been most favorable. But this would have required hundreds of canoes to move all of Cortés's people and supplies. He was unable to procure the required canoes in his position.

Cortés therefore had to choose among three land routes: north to Tlatelolco, which was the least dangerous path but required the longest trip through the city; south to Coyohuacan and Iztapalapa, two towns that would not welcome the Spanish; or west to Tlacopan, which required the shortest trip through Tenochtitlan, though they would not be welcome there either. Cortés decided on the west causeway to Tlacopan, needing the quickest route out of Tenochtitlan with all his provisions and people.

Heavy rains and a moonless night provided some cover for the escaping Spanish. On that "Sad Night," July 1, 1520, the Spanish forces exited the palace first with their indigenous allies close behind, bringing as much treasure as possible. Cortés had hoped to go undetected by muffling the horses' hooves and carrying wooden boards to cross the canals. The Spanish forces successfully crossed the first three canals, the Tecpantzinco, Tzapotlan, and Atenchicalco.

However, they were discovered at the fourth canal at Mixcoatechialtitlan. One account says a woman fetching water saw them and alerted the city, another says it was a sentry. Some Aztecs set out in canoes, others by road to Nonchualco then Tlacopan to cut off the Spaniards. Aztecs in canoes attacked the fleeing Spanish on the Tlacopan causeway, shooting arrows at them. The Spanish fired their crossbows and arquebuses back, but were unable to see their attackers or get into formation. Many Spaniards leaped into the water and drowned, weighed down by armor and booty.

When faced with a gap in the causeway, Alvarado made the famous "leap of Alvarado" using a spear to get to the other side. Approximately a third of the Spaniards succeeded in reaching the mainland, while the others died in battle or were captured and later sacrificed on Aztec altars - these were reported to be mostly the followers of Narváez, less experienced and more weighted down with gold, which was handed out freely before the escape.

After the surviving Spanish crossed over the bridge, the Aztecs attacked them and chased them towards Tlacopan. Many Spaniards were killed, as well as most of the indigenous warriors, and some of the horses before the army could get to their goal, Tlacopan; all of the cannons and most of the crossbows and other weapons were lost. In all battles with main Aztec forces after that, Spaniards noted their lost arms being used against them.

The Spanish finally found refuge in Otancalpolco, where they got aid from the Teocalhueyacans. The morning after, the Aztecs returned to recover the spoils from the canals.

To reach Tlaxcala, Cortés had to bring his troops around Lake Texcoco. The Spanish were under attack the entire trip. Because Cortés took his troops through the northern towns, they were at an advantage. The northern valley was less populous, travel was difficult, and it was still the agricultural season, so the attacks on Cortés's forces were not very heavy. When Cortés and his soldiers arrived at more densely inhabited areas east of the lake, the attacks became more forceful.

=== Battle of Otumba ===
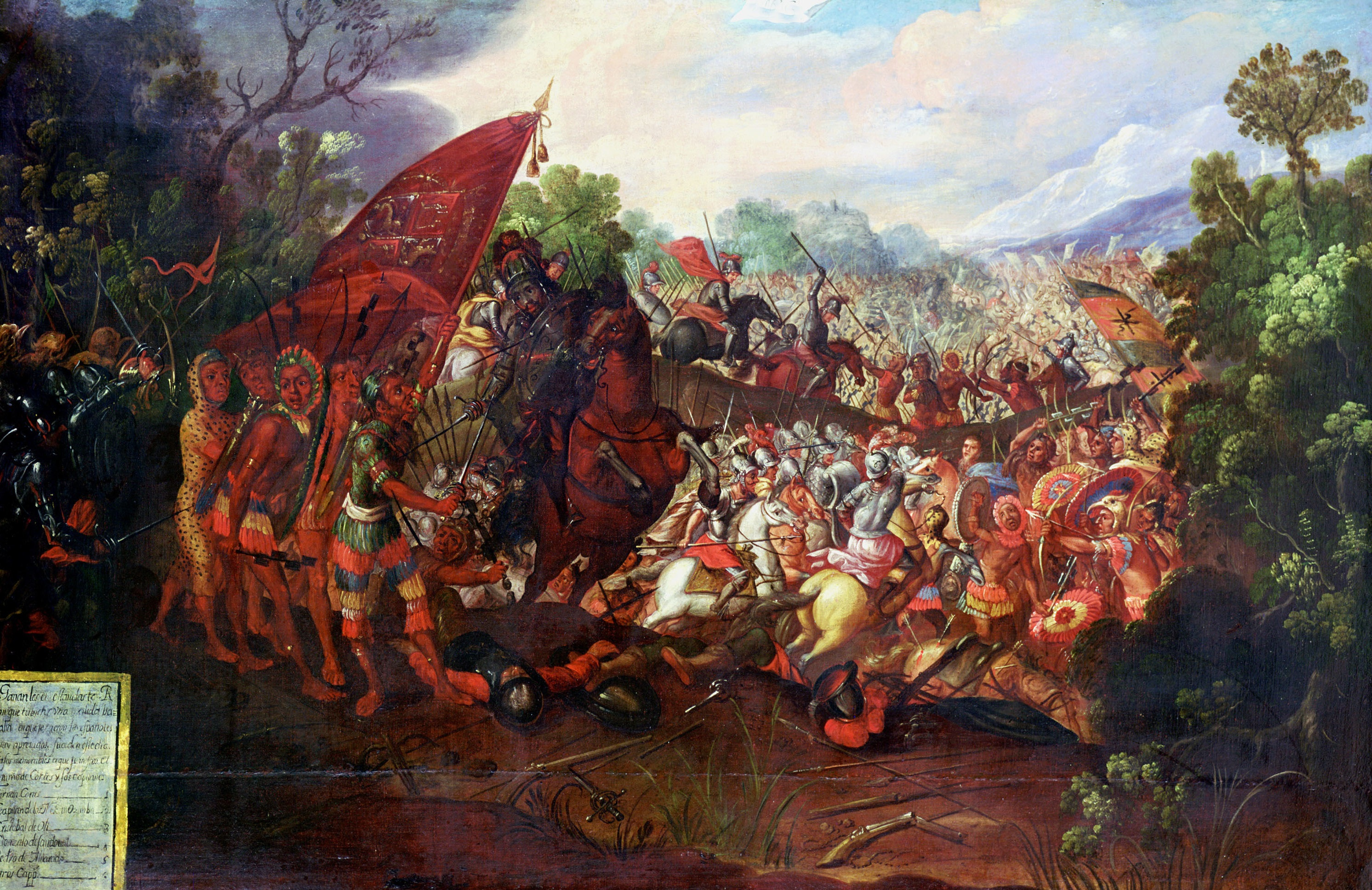
Battle of Otumba

Before reaching Tlaxcala, the scanty Spanish forces arrived at the plain of Otumba Valley (Otompan), where they were met by a vast Aztec army intent on their destruction. The Aztecs intended to cut short the Spanish retreat from Tenochtitlan and annihilate them. Here, the Aztecs made their own errors of judgement by underestimating the shock value of the Spanish caballeros because all they had seen was the horses traveling gingerly on the wet paved streets of Tenochtitlan. They had never seen them used in open battle on the plains. By marshalling on an open plain, they also allowed experienced Spanish commanders to bring to bear their own tactics, weaponry, and the know-how of European warfare.

Despite the overwhelming numbers of Aztecs and the generally poor condition of the Spanish survivors, Cortés snatched victory from the jaws of defeat. He spotted the Aztec commander in his ornate and colourful feather tlahuiztli and immediately charged him with several horsemen, killing the Aztec commander and most other leaders as they were clearly marked by their golden plumage and an easy target for a charge. The many Tlaxcalan allies of the Spanish are mentioned as playing an important role in the battle, armed with Spanish swords and shields. The Spanish suffered some losses, but were victorious over the Aztecs, who then retreated and were pursued by cavalry.

When Cortés finally reached Tlaxcala five days after fleeing Tenochtitlan, he had lost over 860 Spanish soldiers, over a thousand Tlaxcalans, as well as Spanish women who had accompanied Narváez's troops. Cortés claimed only 15 Spaniards were lost along with 2,000 native allies. Cano, another primary source, gives 1,150 Spaniards dead, though this figure was likely too high and might encompass the total loss from entering Mexico to arriving into Tlaxcala. Cortés' chaplain back in Spain, Francisco López de Gómara, estimated that 450 Spaniards and 4,000 allies had died. Other sources estimate that nearly half of the Spanish and almost all of the natives were killed or wounded.

The women survivors included Cortés's translator and lover La Malinche, María Estrada, Beatriz de Palacios, and two of Moctezuma's daughters who had been given to Cortés, including the emperor's favorite and reportedly most beautiful daughter Tecuichpotzin (later Doña Isabel Moctezuma). A third daughter died, leaving behind her infant by Cortés, the mysterious second "María" named in his will.

== Both sides attempt to recover ==
=== Shifting alliances ===
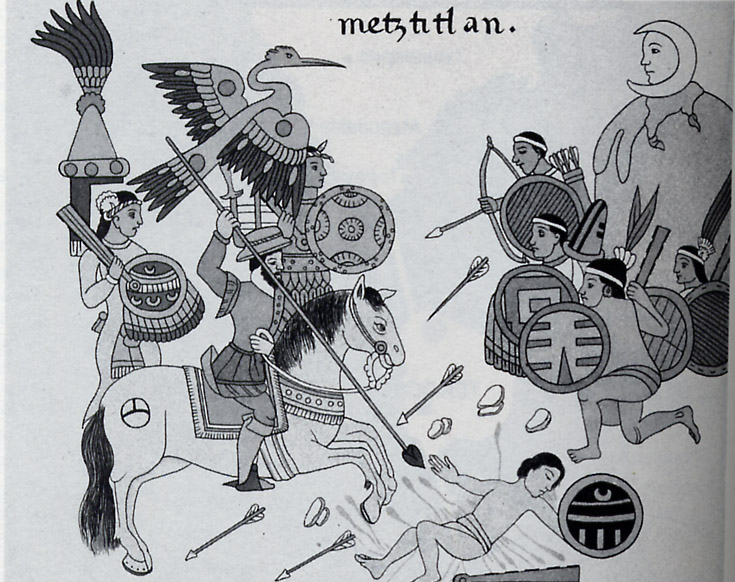
An encounter between Spanish and Aztec combatants as depicted in the History of Tlaxcala.

Cuitláhuac had been elected as the emperor immediately following Moctezuma's death. It was necessary for him to prove his power and authority to keep the tributaries from revolting. Usually, the new king would take his army on a campaign before coronation; this demonstration would solidify necessary ties. However, Cuitláhuac was not in a position to do this, as it was not yet war season; therefore, allegiance to the Spanish seemed to be an option for many tributaries. The Aztec Empire was very susceptible to division: most of the tributary states were divided internally, and their loyalty to the Aztecs was based either on their own interests or fear of punishment.

It was necessary for Cortés to rebuild his alliances after his escape from Tenochtitlan before he could try again to take the city. He started with the Tlaxcalans. Tlaxcala was an autonomous state, and a fierce enemy of the Aztecs. Another strong motivation to join forces with the Spanish was that Tlaxcala was encircled by Aztec tributaries. The Tlaxcalans could have crushed the Spaniards at this point or turned them over to the Aztecs. In fact, the Aztecs sent emissaries promising peace and prosperity if they would do just that. The Tlaxcalan leaders rebuffed the overtures of the Aztec emissaries, deciding to continue their friendship with Cortés.

Cortés managed to negotiate an alliance; however, the Tlaxcalans required heavy concessions from Cortés for their continued support, which he was to provide after they defeated the Aztecs. They expected the Spanish to pay for their supplies, to have the city of Cholula, an equal share of any of the spoils, the right to build a citadel in Tenochtitlan, and finally, to be exempted from any future tribute. Cortés was willing to promise anything in the name of the King of Spain, and agreed to their demands. The Spanish did complain about having to pay for their food and water with their gold and other jewels with which they had escaped Tenochtitlan. The Spanish authorities would later disown this treaty with the Tlaxcalans after the fall of Tenochtitlan.

Cortés needed to gain other new allies as well. If the Spaniards were able to prove they could protect their new allies from the possibility of Aztec retribution, changing sides would not be too difficult for other tributaries. After Cortés' forces managed to defeat the smaller armies of some Aztec tributary states, Tepeyac, and later, Yauhtepec and Cuauhnahuac were easily won over. Cortés also used political maneuvering to assure the allegiance of other states, such as Tetzcoco. In addition, Cortés replaced kings with those who he knew would be loyal to him. Cortés now controlled many major towns, which simultaneously bolstered Cortés's forces while weakening the Aztecs.

Though the largest group of indigenous allies were Tlaxcalans, the Huexotzinco, Atlixco, Tliliuhqui-Tepecs, Tetzcocans, Chalca, Alcohua, and Tepanecs were all important allies as well, and had all been previously subjugated by the Aztecs.

Even the former Triple Alliance member city of Tetzcoco (or Texcoco) became a Spanish ally. As the rebellion attempt led by the Tetzcocan Tlatoani, Cacamatzin, in times of Moctezuma's reclusion was conjured by the Spanish, Cortés named one of Cacamatzin's brothers as new tlatoani. He was Ixtlilxóchitl II, who had disagreed with his brother and always proved friendly to the Spanish. Later, Cortés also occupied the city as base for the construction of brigantines. However, one faction of Tetzcocan warriors remained loyal to the Aztecs.

Cortés had to put down internal struggles among the Spanish troops as well. The remaining Spanish soldiers were somewhat divided; many wanted nothing more than to go home, or at the very least to return to Vera Cruz and wait for reinforcements. Cortés hurriedly quashed this faction, determined to finish what he had started. Not only had he staked everything he had or could borrow on this enterprise, he had completely compromised himself by defying his superior Velázquez. He knew that in defeat he would be considered a traitor to Spain, but that in success he would be its hero. So he argued, cajoled, bullied, and coerced his troops, and they began preparing for the siege of Mexico. In this Cortés showed skill at exploiting the divisions within and between the Aztec states while hiding those of his own troops.

=== Smallpox reduces the local population ===
While Cortés was rebuilding his alliances and garnering more supplies, a smallpox epidemic struck the natives of the Valley of Mexico, including Tenochtitlan. According to Spanish sources, the disease was carried by a black slave from Narváez's forces, Francisco de Eguía, who had stayed in Cempoal due to illness, accidentally infecting the local natives. Smallpox played a crucial role in the Spanish success during the Siege of Tenochtitlan from 1519 to 1521, a fact not mentioned in some historical accounts. The disease broke out in Tenochtitlan in late October 1520. The epidemic lasted sixty days, ending by early December.

Cuitlahuac contracted the disease and died after ruling for eighty days. The disease also affected the Spanish-aligned forces, killing the Tlaxcalan chieftain Maxixcatl, but it had more dire consequences on the side of the Aztecs, enclosed in the cramped Tenochtitlan. After learning about the disease in the allied city of Tepeaca, the Spaniards instructed their allies on how to prevent contagion among them, advising them to avoid bathhouses and not to scratch their skin sores, which lowered the impact among them.

Firsthand accounts were recorded in the Florentine Codex concerning the adverse effects of the smallpox epidemic of the Aztecs, which stated, "many died from this plague, and many others died of hunger. They could not get up and search for food, and everyone else was too sick to care for them, so they starved to death in their beds. By the time the danger was recognized, the plague was well established that nothing could halt it". The smallpox epidemic caused not only infection to the Mexica peoples, but it weakened able bodied people who could no longer grow and harvest their crops, which in turn led to mass famine and death from malnutrition. While the population of Tenochtitlan was recovering, the disease continued to Chalco, a city on the southeast corner of Lake Texcoco that was formerly controlled by the Aztecs but now aligned to the Spanish.

Reproduction and population growth declined since people of child-bearing age either had to fight off the Spanish invasion or died due to famine, malnutrition or other diseases. Diseases like smallpox could travel great distances and spread throughout large populations, which was the case with the Aztecs having lost approximately 50% of its population from smallpox and other diseases. The disease killed an estimated forty percent of the native population in the area within a year. The Aztecs codices give ample depictions of the disease's progression. It was known to them as the huey ahuizotl (great rash).

=== Aztecs regroup ===
It is often debated why the Aztecs took little action against the Spanish and their allies after they fled the city. One reason was that Tenochtitlan was certainly in a state of disorder: the smallpox disease ravaged the population, killing still more important leaders and nobles, and a new king, Cuauhtémoc, son of King Ahuitzotl, was placed on the throne in February 1521. The people were in the process of mourning the dead and rebuilding their damaged city. It is possible that the Aztecs truly believed that the Spanish were gone for good. In addition, Cortés astutely directed his forces in multiple directions in preparing his encirclement of the Aztec capital, and knew how to use the military initiative that he gained after the battle of Otumba.

Staying within Tenochtitlan as a defensive tactic may have seemed like a reliable strategy at the time. This would allow them the largest possible army that would be close to its supplies, while affording them the mobility provided by the surrounding lake. Any Spanish assault would have to come through the causeways, where the Aztecs could easily attack them. As the only Aztec victory against the Spanish was won in the city using their peculiar urban warfare tactics, and as they counted on retaining control over the water, it seems natural that they wanted to risk their main army only to defend their capital. However, it would not be correct to infer that the Aztecs were passive observers of their fate - they did send numerous expeditions to aid their allies against Cortés at every point, with 10 to 20 thousand forces risked in every engagement, such as in Chalco and Chapultepec. They were driven back every time, and some of the native allies won their own victories over the Aztecs, as their dread of their invincible overlords faded with every success of Cortés.

== Siege of Tenochtitlan ==
=== Cortés plans and preparations ===
Cortés's overall plan was to trap and besiege the Aztecs within their capital. Cortés intended to do that primarily by increasing his power and mobility on the lake, while protecting "his flanks while they marched up the causeway", previously one of his main weaknesses. He ordered the construction of thirteen sloops or brigantines in Tlaxcala, by his master shipbuilder, Martín López. Cortés continued to receive a steady stream of supplies from ships arriving at Veracruz, one ship from Spain loaded with "arms and powder", and two ships intended for Narváez. Cortés also received one hundred and fifty soldiers and twenty horses from the abandoned Panuco River settlement, as well as fifty soldiers and seven horses also from Panuco led by Miguel Díez de Aux, a fellow conquistador and the first mestizo in the history of America.

A large source of succour for Cortés were the misguided expeditions by Francisco de Garay, the Governor of Jamaica, who kept sending ship after ship to aid his original Panuco venture long after it had been destroyed and abandoned; all of these ships and forces ended up reinforcing Cortés before the siege.

Cortés then decided to move his army to Texcoco, where he could assemble and launch the sloops in the creeks flowing into Lake Texcoco. With his main headquarters in Texcoco, he could stop his forces from being spread too thin around the lake, and there he could contact them where they needed. Xicotencatl the Elder provided Cortés with over ten thousand Tlaxcalan warriors under the command of Chichimecatecuhtli. Cortés departed Tlaxcala on the day after Christmas 1520. When his force arrived at the outskirts of Texcoco, he was met by seven chieftains stating their leader Coanacotzin begs "for your friendship". Cortés quickly replaced that leader with Ixtlilxochitl II, the son of Nezahualpilli, baptized as Don Hernán Cortés.

After winning over Chalco and Tlalmanalco, Cortés sent eight Mexican prisoners to Cuauhtemoc stating, "all the towns in the neighborhood were now on our side, as well as the Tlaxcalans". Cortés intended to blockade Mexico and then destroy it. Once Martin López and Chichimecatecuthli brought the logs and planks to Texcoco, the sloops were built quickly. Cuauhtemoc's forces were defeated four times in March 1521, around Chalco and Huaxtepec, and Cortés received another ship load of arms and men from the Emperor.

On 6 April 1521, Cortés met with the caciques around Chalco, and announced he would "bring peace" and blockade Mexico. He wanted all of their warriors ready the next day when he put thirteen sloops into the lake (misleadingly called "launches" in some translations). He was then joined at Chimaluacan by twenty thousand warriors from Chalco, Texcoco, Huejotzingo, and Tlaxcala. Cortés fought a major engagement with seventeen thousand of Cuauhtemoc's warriors at Xochimilco, before continuing his march northwestward. Cortés found Coyoacan, Tacuba, Azcapotzalco, and Cuauhitlan deserted.

Returning to Texcoco, which had been guarded by his Captain Gonzalo de Sandoval, Cortés was joined by many more men from Castile. Cortés then discovered a plot aimed at his murder, for which he had the main conspirator, Antonio de Villafana, hanged. Thereafter, Cortés had a personal guard of six soldiers, under the command of Antonio de Quiñones. The Spaniards also held their third auctioning of branded slaves, Mexican allies captured by Cortés, "who had revolted after giving their obedience to His Majesty."

Cortés had 84 horsemen, 194 arbalesters and arquebusiers, plus 650 Spanish foot soldiers. He stationed 25 men on every sloop, 12 oarsmen, 12 crossbowmen and musketeers, and a captain. Each sloop had rigging, sails, oars, and spare oars. Additionally, Cortés had 20,000 warriors from Tlaxcala, Huexotzinco, and Cholula. The Tlaxcalans were led by Xicotencatl II and Chichimecatecuthli. Cortés was ready to start the blockade of Mexico after Corpus Christi (feast).

Cortés put Alvarado in command of 30 horsemen, 18 arbalesters and arquebusiers, 150 Spanish foot soldiers, and 8,000 Tlaxcalan allies, and sent him, accompanied by his brother Jorge de Alvarado, Gutierrez de Badajoz, and Andrés de Monjaraz, to secure Tacuba. Cristóbal de Olid took 30 horsemen, 20 arbalesters and arquebusiers, 175 foot soldiers, and 8,000 Tlaxcalan allies, accompanied by Andrés de Tapia, Francisco Verdugo, and Francisco de Lugo, and secured Coyohuacan. Gonzalo de Sandoval took 24 horsemen, 14 arquebusiers and arbalesters, 150 Spanish foot soldiers, and 8,000 warriors from Chalco and Huexotzinco, accompanied by Luis Marin and Pedro de Ircio, to secure Ixtlapalapan. Cortés commanded the 13 sloops. Cortés' forces took up these positions on May 22.

=== First battles ===
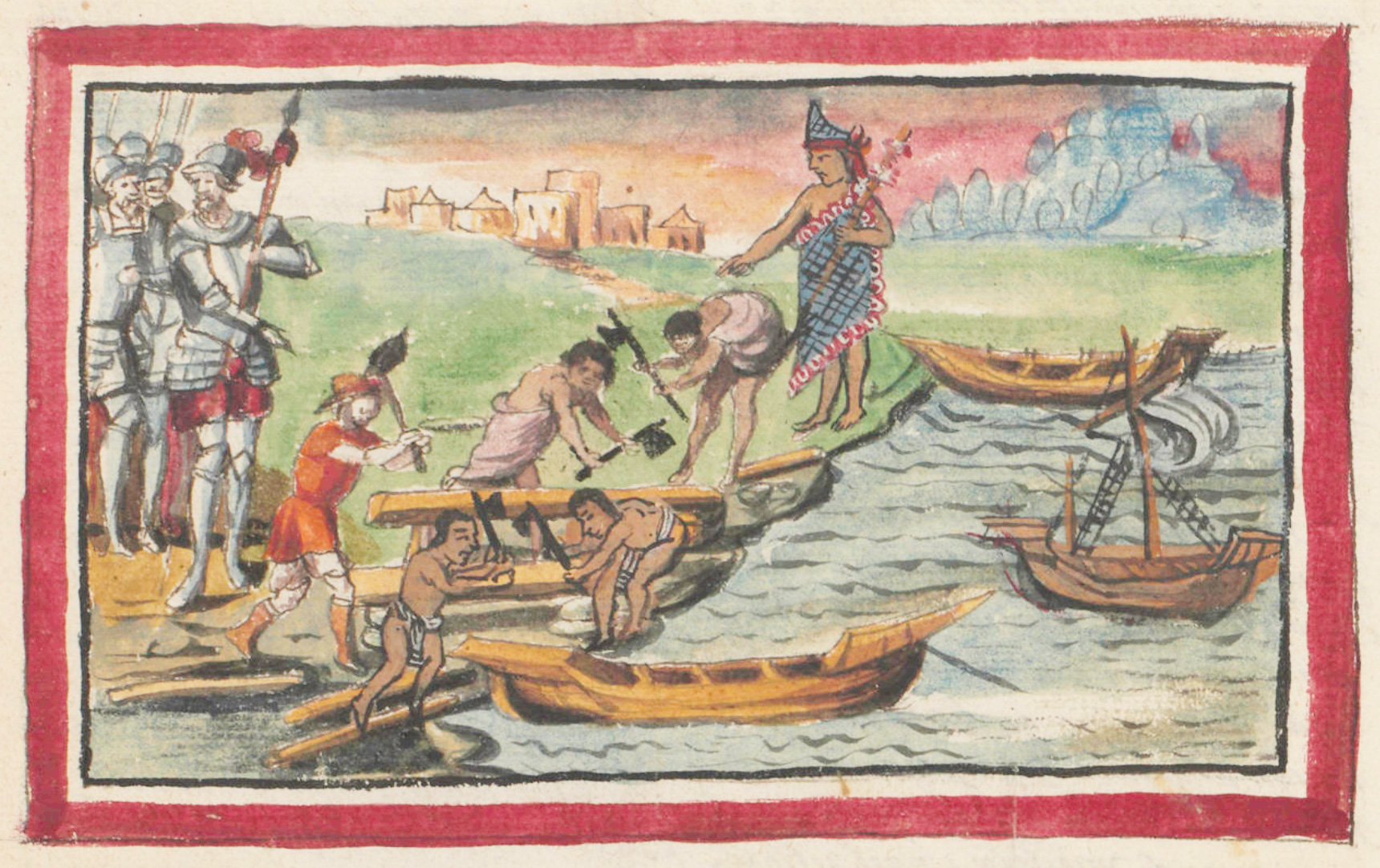
Cortes builds the brigantines.

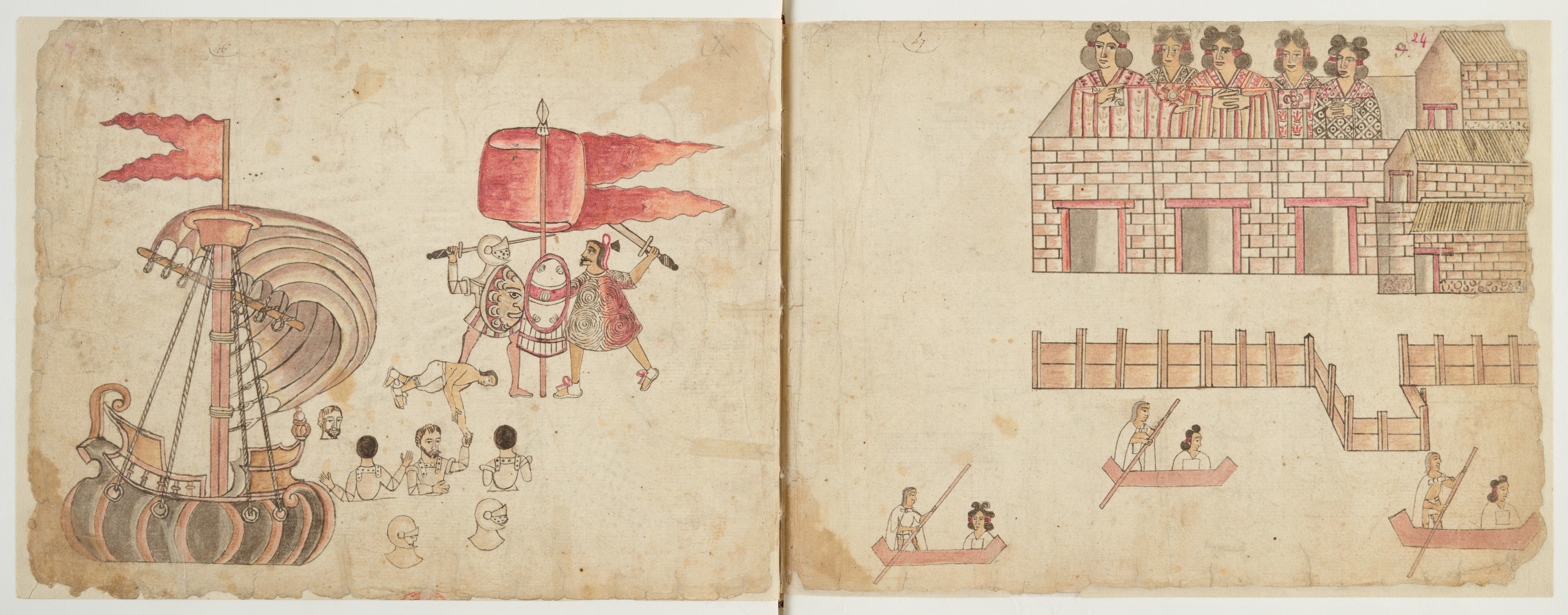
A battle in the shores of Lake Texcoco during the Siege of Tenochtitlan

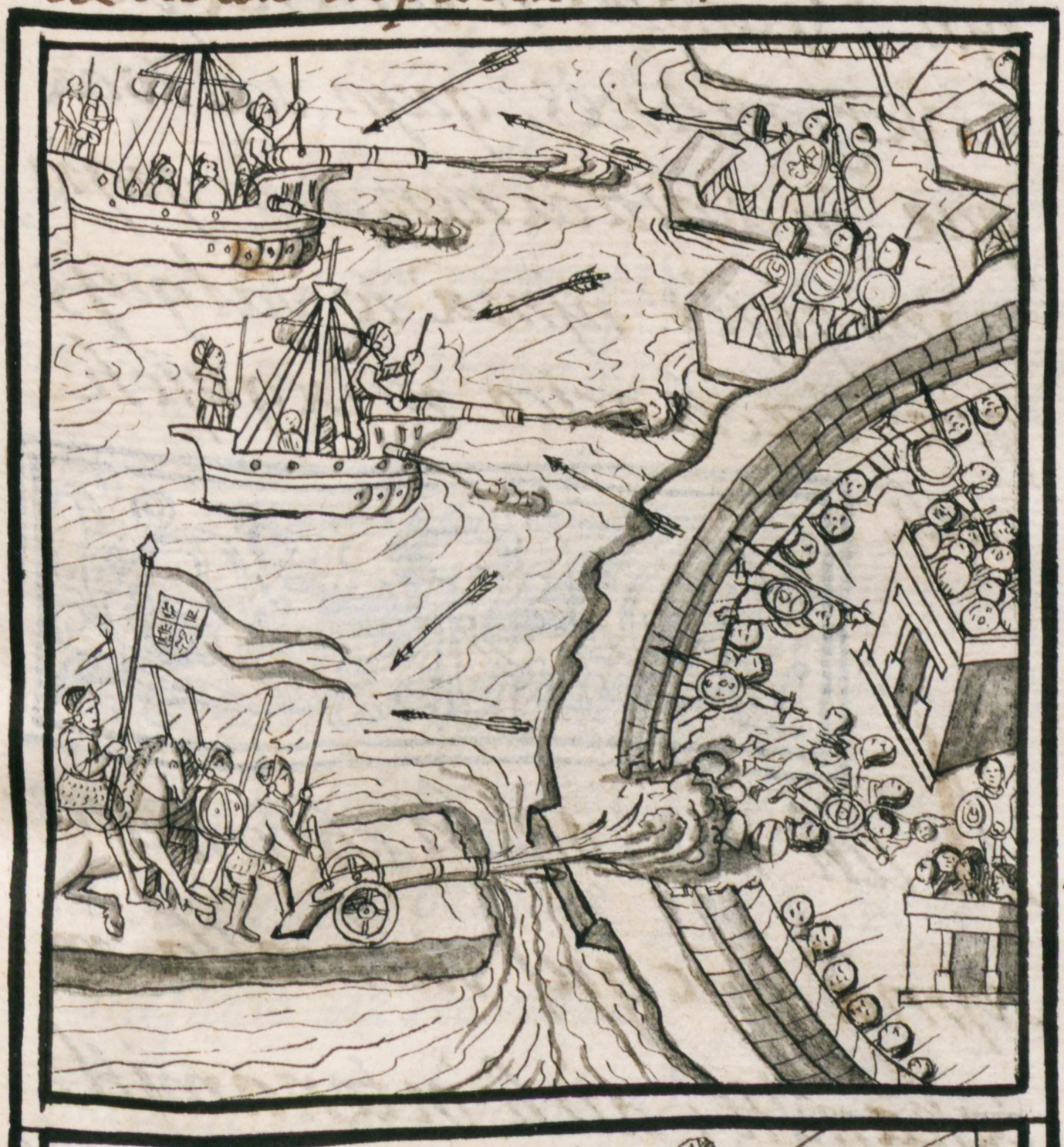
Naval assault upon the city.

The forces under Alvarado and Olid marched first towards Chapultepec to disconnect the Aztecs from their water supply. There were springs there that supplied much of the city's water by aqueduct; the rest of the city's water was brought in by canoe. The two generals then tried to bring their forces over the causeway at Tlacopan, resulting in the Battle of Tlacopan. The Aztec forces managed to push back the Spanish and halt this assault on the capital with a determined and hard-fought land and naval counterattack.

Cortés faced "more than a thousand canoes" after he launched his thirteen sloops from Texcoco. Yet a "favorable breeze sprang up", enabling him to overturn many canoes and kill or capture many. After winning the First Battle on the Lake, Cortés camped with Olid's forces.

The Aztec canoe fleets worked well for attacking the Spanish because they allowed the Aztecs to surround the Spanish on both sides of the causeway. Cortés decided to make an opening in the causeway so that his brigantines could help defend his forces from both sides. He then distributed the sloops amongst his attacking forces, four to Alvarado, six for Olid, and two to Sandoval on the Tepeaquilla causeway. After this move, the Aztecs could no longer attack from their canoes on the opposite side of the Spanish brigantines, and "the fighting went very much in our favour", according to Díaz.

With his brigantines, Cortés could also send forces and supplies to areas he previously could not, which put a kink in Cuauhtémoc's plan. To make it more difficult for the Spanish ships to aid the Spanish soldier's advance along the causeways, the Aztecs dug deep pits in shallow areas of the lakes, into which they hoped the Spaniards would stumble, and fixed concealed stakes into the lake bottom to impale the launches. The Spanish horses were also ineffective on the causeways.

Cortés was forced to adapt his plans again, as his initial land campaigns were ineffective. He had planned to attack on the causeways during the daytime and retreat to camp at night; however, the Aztecs moved in to occupy the abandoned bridges and barricades as soon as the Spanish forces left. Consequently, Cortés had his forces set up on the causeways at night to defend their positions. Cortés also sent orders to "never on any account to leave a gap unblocked, and that all the horsemen were to sleep on the causeway with their horses saddled and bridled all night long." This allowed the Spanish to progress closer and closer towards the city.

The Spaniards prevented food and water from reaching Tenochtitlan along the three causeways. They limited the supplies reaching the city from the nine surrounding towns via canoe, by sending out two of their launches on nightly capture missions. However, the Aztecs were successful in setting an ambush with thirty of their pirogues in an area in which they had placed impaling stakes. They captured two Spanish launches, killing Captains Juan de la Portilla and Pedro Barba.

=== Spanish advance closer ===
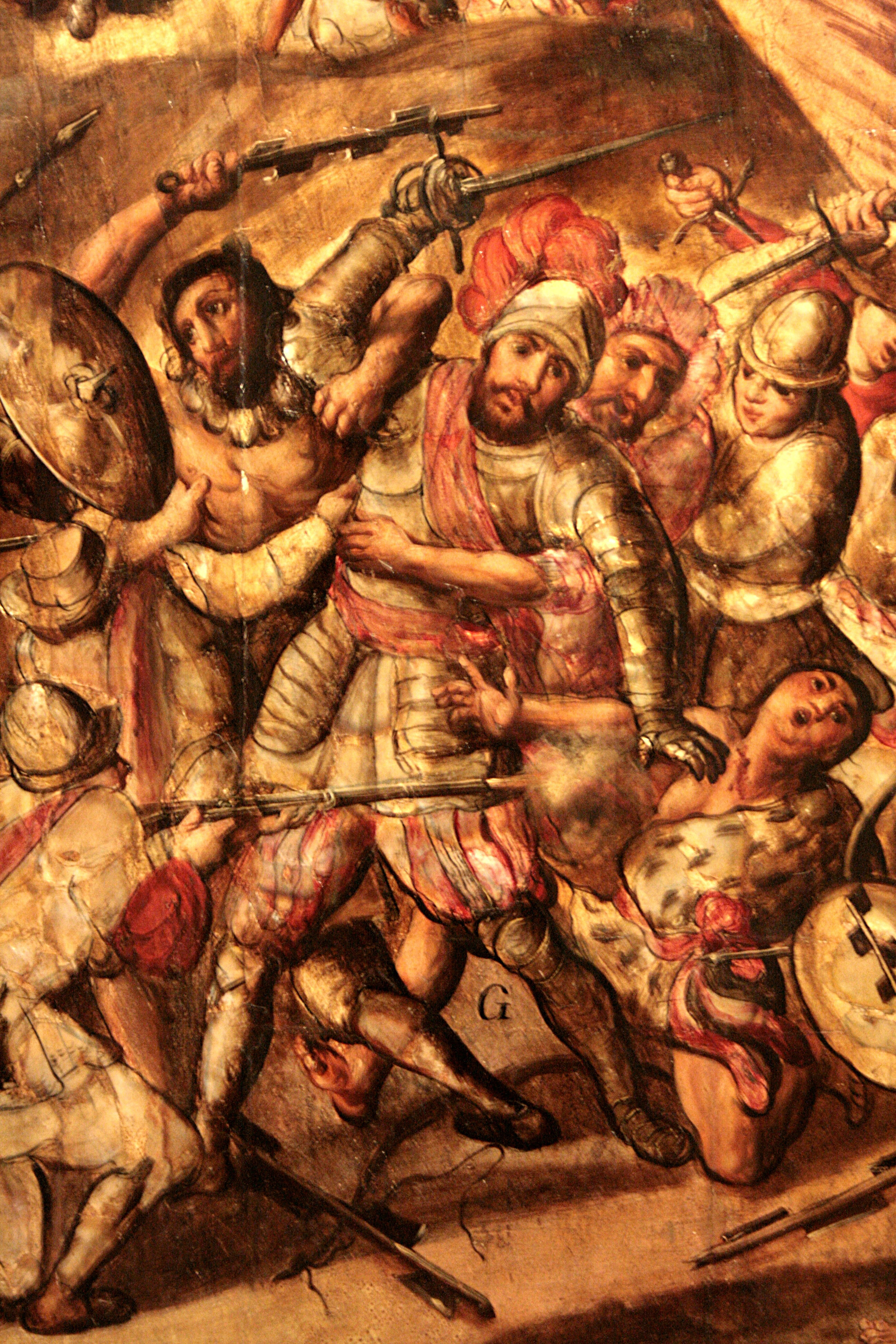
During the siege of Tenochtitlan, Hernan Cortés narrowly escaped capture by Aztec warriors. Detail of a painting at the Museo de América, Madrid, Spain.

After capturing two chieftains, Cortés learned of another Aztec plot to ambush his launches with forty pirogues. Cortés then organized a counter-ambush with six of his launches, which was successful, "killing many warriors and taking many prisoners." Afterwards, the Aztec "did not dare to lay any more ambuscades, or to bring in food and water as openly as before." Lakeside towns, including Iztapalapa, Churubusco, Culuacan, and Mixquic made peace with the Spaniards. The fighting in Tenochtitlan was described by the American historian Charles Robinson as "desperate" as both sides battled one another in the streets in a ferocious battle where no quarter was given nor asked for.

Cuauhtemoc then attacked all three Spanish camps simultaneously with his entire army on the feast day of St. John. On the Tacuba Causeway across Lake Texcoco connecting Tenochtitlan to the mainland along a street now known as Puente de Alvarado (Alvarado's Bridge) in Mexico City, Pedro de Alvarado made a mad cavalry charge across a gap in the Causeway. As Alvarado and his cavalry emerged on the other side of the gap with the infantry behind, Aztec canoes filled the gap. Pedro de Alvarado was wounded along with eight men in his camp. Alvarado escaped from the ambush, but five of his men were captured and taken off to the Great Temple to be sacrificed. Much to their horror, the Spanish from their positions could see their captured comrades being sacrificed on the Great Pyramid, which increased their hatred of the Aztecs. At the end of each day, the Spanish gave a prayer: "Oh, thanks be to God that they did not carry me off today to be sacrificed."

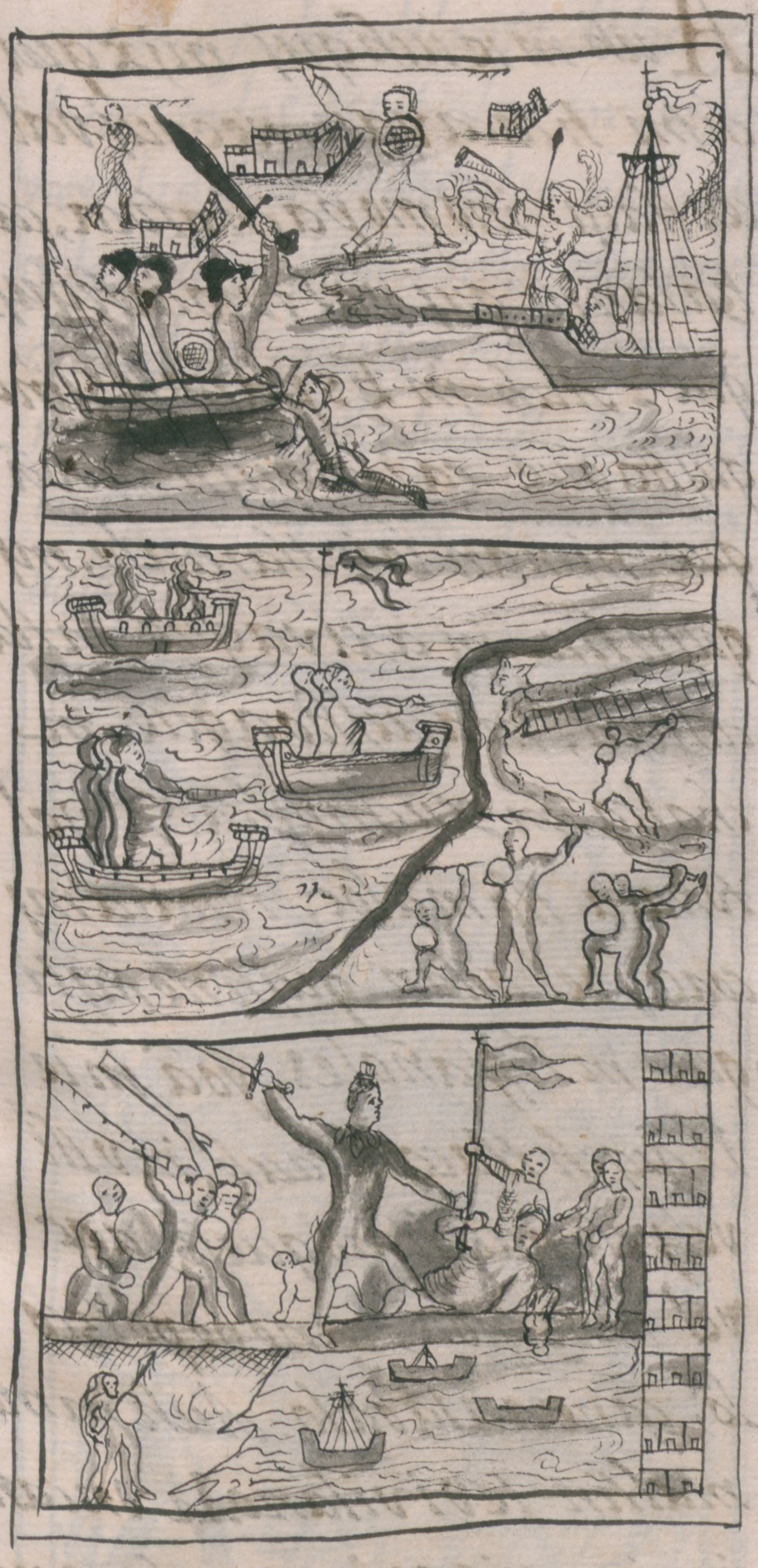
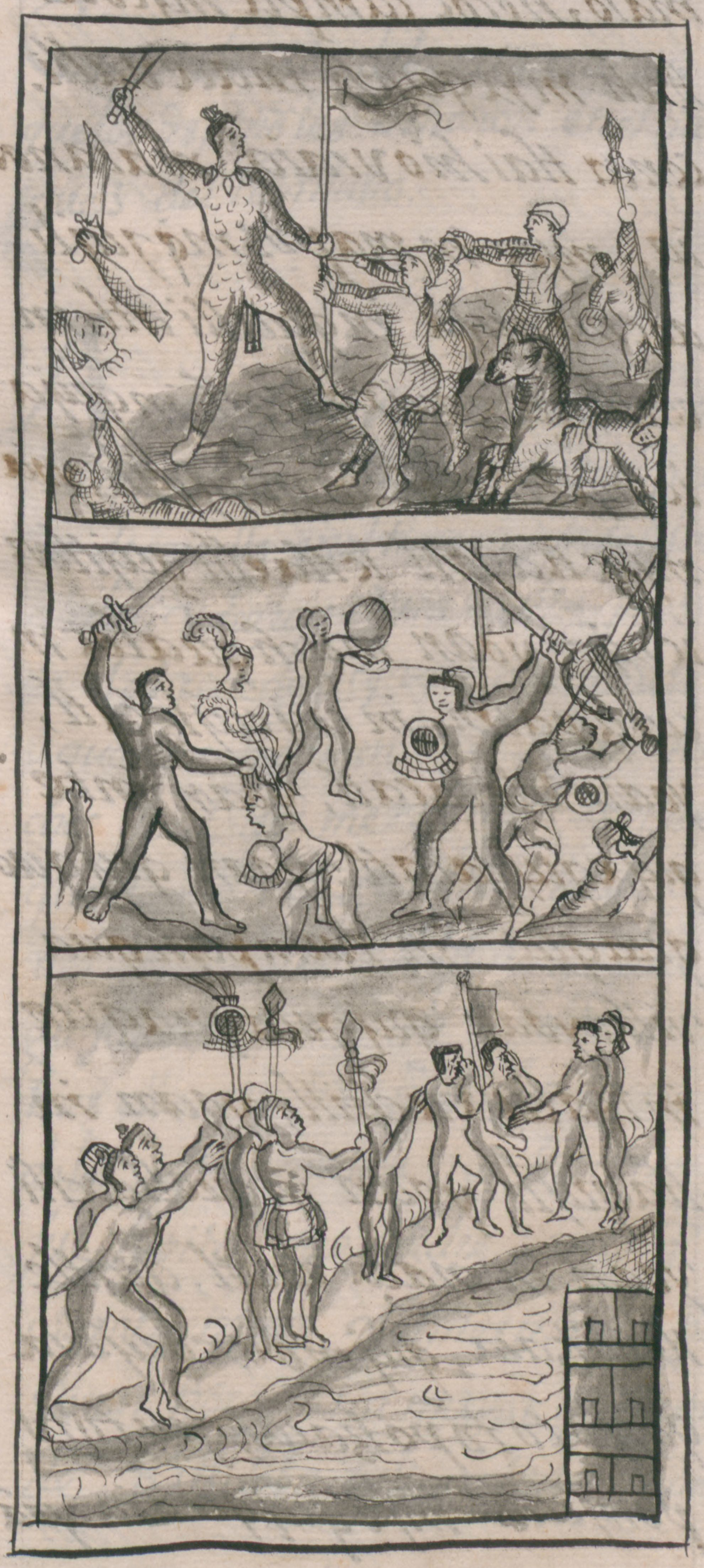
Scenes of the Battle of Colhuacatonco in the Florentine Codex. The scenes at the left depict the beginning of the battle as the Spanish assault force advanced into the city, and the scenes at the right depict the victorious Mexica forces expelling the last assault forces and taking their prisoners to be sacrificed.

Cortés then decided to push forward a simultaneous attack towards the Mexican market square, resulting in what is now known as the Battle of Colhuacatonco. However, he neglected to fill in a channel as he advanced, and when the Aztec counter-attacked, Cortés was wounded and almost captured. Cristóbal de Olea and Cristóbal de Guzmán gave their lives for Cortés, and sixty-five Spanish soldiers were captured alive. Cuauhtemoc then had five of their heads thrown at Alvarado's camp, four thrown at Cortés' camp, six thrown at Sandoval's camp, while ten more were sacrificed to the Huitzilopochtli and Texcatlipoca idols.

Díaz relates, "...the dismal drum of Huichilobos sounded again,...we saw our comrades who had been captured in Cortés' defeat being dragged up the steps to be sacrificed...cutting open their chests, drew out their palpitating hearts which they offered to the idols...the Indian butchers...cut off their arms and legs...then they ate their flesh with a sauce of peppers and tomatoes...throwing their trunks and entrails to the lions and tigers and serpents and snakes." Cuauhtemoc then "sent the hands and feet of our soldiers, and the skin of their faces...to all the towns of our allies..." The Aztec sacrificed a batch of Spanish prisoners each night for ten nights. The Aztec cast off the cooked limbs of their prisoners to the Tlaxcalans, shouting: "Eat the flesh of these teules ["Gods"-a reference to the early belief that Spanish were gods] and of your brothers because we are sated with it".

The Aztec continued to attack the Spaniards on the causeways, "day and night". The Spanish allies in the cities surrounding the lake lost many lives or "went home wounded", and "half their canoes were destroyed". Yet, "they did not help the Aztec any more, for they loathed them." Yet, of the 24,000 allies, only 200 remained in the three Spanish camps, the rest deciding to return home. Ahuaxpitzactzin (later baptized as Don Carlos), the brother of the Texcoco lord Don Fernando, remained in Cortés' camp with forty relatives and friends. The Huejotzinco Cacique remained in Sandoval's camp with fifty men. Alvarado's camp had Chichimecatecuhtli, the two sons of Lorenzo de Vargas, and eighty Tlaxcalans. To maintain the advance, Cortés razed every neighborhood he captured, using the rubble to fill up canals and gaps in the causeways to allow his infantry and cavalry to advance in formation, a fighting tactic that favored the Spanish instead of engaging in hand-to-hand street fighting, which favored the Aztec.

Cortés then concentrated on letting the Aztec "eat up all the provisions they have" and drink brackish water. The Spaniards gradually advanced along the causeways, though without allies. Their launches had freedom of the lake, after devising a method for breaking the impaling stakes the Aztec had placed for them. After twelve days of this, the Spanish allies realized the prophecy by the Aztec idols, that the Spaniards would be dead in ten days, was false. Two thousand warriors returned from Texcoco, as did many Tlaxcan warriors under Tepaneca from Topeyanco, and those from Huejotzingo and Cholula. Cuauhtemoc then enlisted his allies in Matlazingo, Malinalco, and Tulapa, in attacking the Spaniards from the rear. However, Cortés sent Andrés de Tapia, with 20 horsemen and 100 soldiers, and Gonzalo de Sandoval, with 20 horsemen and 80 soldiers, to help his allies attack this new threat. They returned with two of the Matlazingo chieftains as prisoners.

As the Spanish employed more successful strategies, their stranglehold on Tenochtitlan tightened, and famine began to affect the Aztecs. The Aztecs were cut off from the mainland because of the occupied causeways. Cortés also had the advantage of fighting a mostly defensive battle. Though Cuauhtémoc organized a large-scale attack on Alvarado's forces at Tlacopan, the Aztec forces were pushed back. Throughout the siege, the Aztecs had little aid from outside of Tenochtitlan. The remaining loyal tributaries had difficulty sending forces, because it would leave them vulnerable to Spanish attack. Many of these loyal tributaries were surrounded by the Spanish.

Though the tributaries often went back and forth in their loyalties at any sign of change, the Spanish tried hard not to lose any allies. They feared a "snowball effect": if one tributary left, others might follow. Therefore, they brutally crushed any tributaries who tried to send help to Tenochtitlan. Any shipments of food and water were intercepted, and even those trying to fish in the lake were attacked. The situation inside the city was desperate: because of the famine and the smallpox there were already thousands of victims, women offered to the gods even their children's clothes, so most children were stark naked. Many Aztecs drank dirty, brackish water because of their severe thirst and contracted dysentery. The famine was so severe that the Aztecs ate anything, even wood, leather, and bricks for sustenance.

The Spanish continued to push closer to Tenochtitlan. The Aztecs changed tactics as often as the Spanish did, preventing Cortés's forces from being entirely victorious. However, the Aztecs were severely worn down. They had no new troops, supplies, food, nor water. The Spanish received a large amount of supplies from Vera Cruz, and, somewhat renewed, finally entered the main part of Tenochtitlan.

=== Aztecs' last stand ===
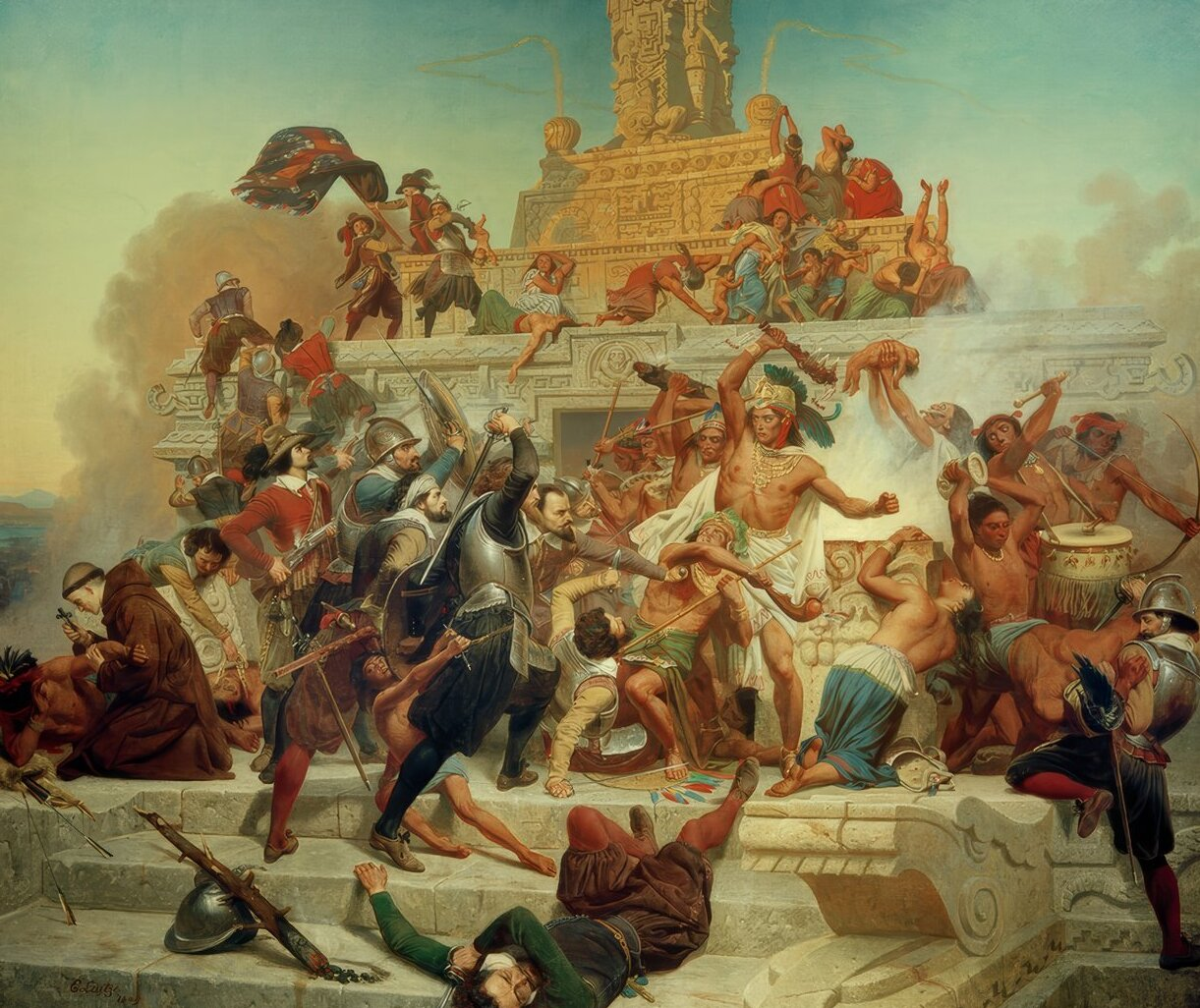
The Storming of the Teocalli by Cortez and His Troops (Emanuel Leutze, 1848)

Cortés then ordered a simultaneous advance of all three camps towards the Tlatelolco marketplace. Alvarado's company made it there first, and Gutierrez de Badajoz advanced to the top of the Huichilopotzli cu, setting it afire and planting their Spanish banners. Cortés' and Sandoval's men were able to join them there after four more days of fighting.

The Spanish forces and their allies advanced into the city. Despite inflicting heavy casualties, the Aztecs could not halt the Spanish advance. While the fighting in the city raged, the Aztecs cut out and ate the hearts of 70 Spanish prisoners-of-war at the altar to Huitzilopochtli. By August, many of the native inhabitants had fled Tlatelolco. Cortés sent emissaries to negotiate with the Tlatelolcas to join his side, but the Tlatelolcas remained loyal to the Aztecs.

Throughout the battles with the Spanish, the Aztecs still practiced their traditional ceremonies and customs. Tlapaltecatl Opochtzin was chosen to be outfitted to wear the quetzal owl costume. He was supplied with darts sacred to Huitzilopochtli, which came with wooden tips and flint tops. When he came, the Spanish soldiers appeared scared and intimidated. They chased the owl-warrior, but he was neither captured nor killed. The Aztecs took this as a good sign, but they could fight no more, and after discussions with the nobles, Cuauhtémoc began talks with the Spanish.

At some point in the final days of the battle, a tornado struck the basin, over Tlatelolco, and then moved out over the lake. This was the first tornado seen by Europeans in the Americas.

After several failed peace overtures to Cuauhtémoc, Cortés ordered Sandoval to attack that part of the city in which Cuauhtémoc had retreated. As hundreds of canoes filled the lake fleeing the doomed city, Cortés sent his brigantines out to intercept them. Cuauhtémoc attempted to flee with his property, gold, jewels, and family in fifty pirogues, but was soon captured by Sandoval's launches, and brought before Cortés.

== Surrender ==
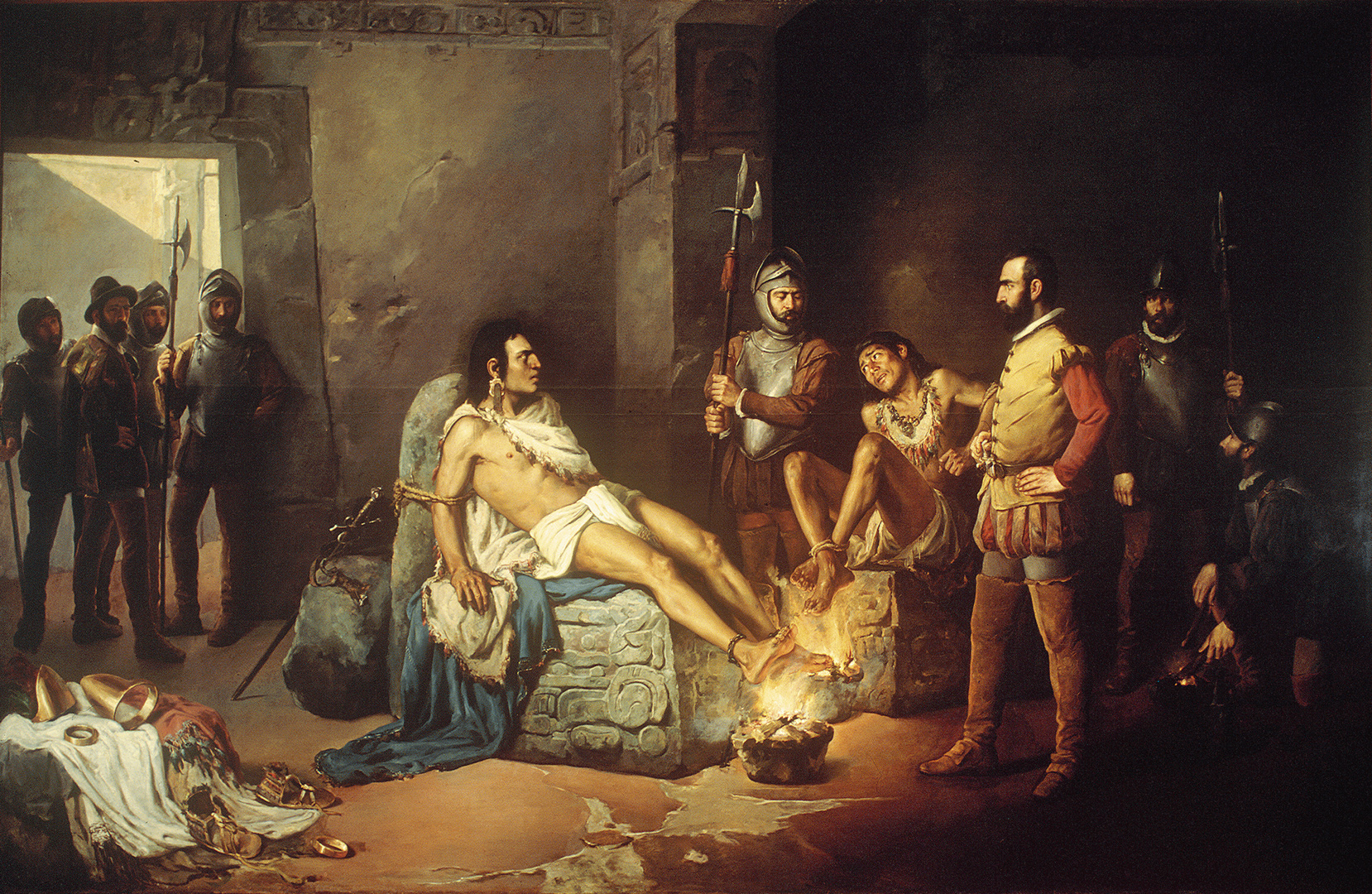
"The Torture of Cuauhtémoc", a 19th-century painting by Leandro Izaguirre

The Aztec forces were destroyed and the Aztecs surrendered on 13 August 1521, Julian Date. Cortés demanded the return of the gold lost during La Noche Triste. Under torture, by burning their feet with oil, Cuauhtémoc and the lord of Tacuba confessed to dumping his gold and jewels into the lake. Yet, little gold remained, as earlier, a fifth had been sent to Spain and another kept by Cortés. "In the end...the remaining gold all fell to the King's officials."

Cuauhtémoc was taken prisoner the same day, as related above, and remained the titular leader of Tenochtitlan, under the control of Cortés, until he was hanged for treason in 1525 while accompanying a Spanish expedition to Guatemala.

=== Casualties and atrocities ===
100,000 to 240,000 were killed in the campaign overall including warriors and civilians. As many as 40,000 Aztec bodies were floating in the canals or awaiting burial after the siege. Almost all of the Aztec nobility were dead, and the remaining survivors were mostly young women and very young children. At least 40,000 Aztec civilians were killed and captured. The survivors marched out of the city for the next three days.

The native allies of the Spanish, primarily the Tlaxcalans, continued to attack even after the surrender, slaughtering thousands of the remaining civilians and looting the city. They did not spare women or children: they entered houses, stealing all precious things they found, raping and then killing women and stabbing children. One source claims 6,000 were massacred in the town of Ixtapalapa alone. This was part of a merciless campaign against the Aztecs who had long oppressed them, as for a hundred years the Tlaxcalans had been forced to hand over an annual quota of young men and women to be sacrificed and eaten at the Great Pyramid of Tenochtitlan, and now the Tlaxcalans saw their chance for revenge. American historian Charles Robinson wrote: "Centuries of hate and the basic viciousness of Mesoamerican warfare combined in violence that appalled Cortés himself". In letter to the Holy Roman Emperor Charles V, Cortés wrote:

"We had more trouble in preventing our allies from killing with such cruelty than we had in fighting the enemy. For no race, however savage, has ever practiced such fierce and unnatural cruelty as the natives of these parts. Our allies also took many spoils that day, which we were unable to prevent, as they numbered more than 150,000 and we Spaniards only some nine hundred. Neither our precautions nor our warnings could stop their looting, though we did all we could... I had posted Spaniards in every street, so that when the people began to come out [to surrender] they might prevent our allies from killing those wretched people, whose numbers was uncountable. I also told the captains of our allies that on no account should any of those people be slain; but there were so many that we could not prevent more than fifteen thousand being killed and sacrificed [by the Tlaxcalans] that day".

Due to the wholesale slaughter after the campaign and the destruction of Aztec culture many sources such as Israel Charney, John C. Cox, and Norman Naimark consider the siege a genocide.

Although some reports put the number as low as forty, the Spanish lost over 100 soldiers in the siege, while thousands of Tlaxcalans perished. It is estimated that around 1,800 Spaniards died from all causes during the two-year campaign—from Veracruz to Tenochtitlan. (Thomas, pp. 528–29) The remaining Spanish forces consisted of 800–900 Spaniards, eighty horses, sixteen pieces of artillery, and Cortés' thirteen brigantines. Other sources estimate that around 860 Spanish soldiers and 20,000 Tlaxcalan warriors were killed during all the battles in this region from 1519 to 1521. It is well accepted that Cortés' indigenous allies, which may have numbered as many as 200,000 over the three-year period of the conquest, were indispensable to his success. Cortés' lieutenant Bernal Díaz del Castillo especially credited La Malinche with their victory.

== See also ==
- History of Mexico
- History of the Aztecs
- Qualpopoca
