= Xicotencatl II =

Pre-Columbian prince and warleader

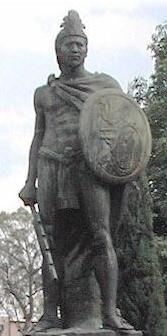
- Xicohténcatl Axayacatzin

Regent of Tlaxcalla (de facto)
- Regency: ? - 1521
- Tlatoani: Xicotencatl the Elder
- Died: 1521 (aged mid-30s)
- Father: Xicotencatl the Elder

Xicotencatl II Axayacatl, also known as Xicotencatl the Younger (died 1521), was a prince and warleader, probably with the title of Tlacochcalcatl, of the pre-Columbian state of Tlaxcallān at the time of the Spanish conquest of the Aztec Empire.

== Biography ==
An ethnic Tlaxcaltec, Xicotencatl the Younger was the son of the ruler of Tizatlan, one of the four confederate altepemeh of the Tlaxcalan state, of which he was considered to be the de facto ruler because of his father's weakened health. His Nahuatl name, pronounced [ʃiːkoʔˈteːŋkatɬ], is sometimes also spelled Xīcohtēncatl and means "person from Xīcotēnco," a place name that can be translated "at the edge of the bumblebees."

He is known primarily as the leader of the force that was dispatched from Tlaxcallan to intercept the forces of Hernán Cortés and his Totonac allies as they entered Tlaxcalan territory when going inland from the Veracruz coast. His actions are described in the letters of Cortés, Bernal Díaz del Castillo's Historia verdadera de la conquista de la Nueva España and in the histories of Tlaxcala, such as the one by Diego Muñoz Camargo.

Xicotencatl was described by Castillo as:

[…] a tall man, broad-shouldered, and well-built, with a large fresh coloured face, full of scars, as if pitted with the smallpox. He may have been about thirty-five years of age, and was earnest and dignified in his deportment.

When fighting the Spaniards he used an ambush strategy: first engaging the enemy with a small force that feigned retreat, and then luring the Spaniards back to a better-fortified position, whereat the main force was waiting. The Spaniards retreated when too many of their men were killed or wounded, and thence sought a peace treaty with the Tlaxcalteca. Maxixcatzin, the ruler of Ocotelolco, was in favour of allying with the Spaniards, but Xicotencatl II opposed this idea and continued to fight, nearly wiping out the Spanish force; however, the soldiers from Ocotelolco retreated from the battlefield at a crucial moment, following the orders of Maxixcatzin, and Xicotencatl was forced to accept the proposed peace treaty.

The Spaniard and Tlaxcalan forces marched on Tenochtitlan, where they stayed until the Noche Triste, at which time they were forced to flee the city after an Aztec uprising. The remnants of the Spanish forces made it to Tlaxcallan, where they once again asked for the assistance of the Tlaxcalteca, and where Xicotencatl II once again spoke against helping them. However, Maxixcatzin's faction was again successful, and the Spaniards stayed in his palace while they regrouped and received reinforcements.

When the final stage of the siege of Tenochtitlan was about to be carried out, Xicotencatl marched on the Aztec capital as the leader of a Tlaxcalan force, attacking from the north and passing by Texcoco. The night before the final march, he was apprehended and accused of treason by Cortés and by the Ocotelolcan warleader Chichimecateuctli, who said that he had tried to flee back to Tlaxcala. He was summarily and discreetly executed by hanging.

Xicotencatl's character has been subject to changing interpretations as the general understanding of the Spanish conquest of Mexico has shifted. In the early period, he was seen mostly as a traitor who had tried to halt the Spanish liberation of the Indians, by delivering them back into Aztec domination; (Note: See for example the description in chapter IX of the Historia de Tlaxcala by Muñoz Camargo.) later, he was construed, romantically, as an indigenous hero who valiantly opposed the onslaught of the Spanish.

Ethnohistorian Ross Hassig has assessed Xicotencatl's actions in terms of Tlaxcalan politics, proposing that Xicotencatl is best understood as acting to further the political interests of his own polity—Tizatlan—over the opposing faction of Ocotelolco. The charge of treason lodged against him and his subsequent execution, with the apparent assent of the Tlaxcalan ruling council and their Huexotzincan allies, were, in this view, the logical result of the Ocotelolcans finally achieving the upper hand.

== See also ==
- Xicotencatl the Elder

== Bibliography ==
- Diaz Del Castillo, Bernal (1963). The Conquest of New Spain (2 ed.). Pneguin Books. ISBN 9780140441239.
- Hassig, Ross (January 2001). "Xicotencatl: rethinking an indigenous Mexican hero" (PDF). Estudios de Cultura Náhuatl. 32. México, D.F.: Instituto de Investigaciones Históricas—Universidad Nacional Autónoma de México: 29–49. ISSN 0071-1675. OCLC 1568281. Archived from the original (PDF online reproduction) on 2018-10-09.
- Muñoz Camargo, Diego (1892) [1585]. Historia de Tlaxcala. published and annotated by Alfredo Chavero, Mexico.
