= Tizatlan =

Polity in pre-Columbian Mexico

Coordinates: 19°20′16″N 98°13′5″W

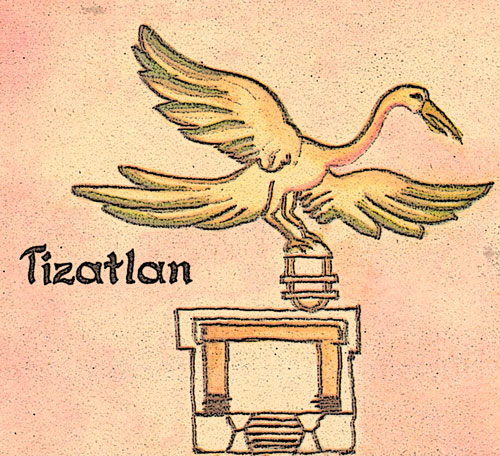
Glyph for Tizatlan

Tizatlan, in pre-Columbian Mexico, was one of the four independent altepemeh (polities, sing. altepetl) that constituted the confederation of Tlaxcallan. Today Tizatlan is a part of the modern city of Tlaxcala, and the Pre-Columbian city is visible as a small archaeological site in the San Esteban Tizatlán district of the city. The site is in the state of Tlaxcala in central Mexico.

The name is Nahuatl and contains the elements tizatl (chalk) and tlan (place).

== History ==
Tizatlan was the third of the four altepemeh to be founded, but at the time of the Spanish conquest of Mexico it was, along with Ocotelolco, the most powerful of the four allied communities. Where Ocotelolco held the economical power, having the main market in the region, Tizatlan had the military power and commanded the Tlaxcallan armies.

When the Spanish arrived in Mexico Tizatlan was ruled by the aging Xicotencatl I "the Elder" aided by his son the military leader Xicotencatl II "the Younger". Through a series of political events Ocotelolco finally achieved dominance over Tizatlan at the end of the conquest.

== Bibliography ==
- Hassig, Ross (2001) "Xicotencatl: rethinking an indigenous Mexican hero", Estudios de Cultura Nahuatl, UNAM (Estudios de Cultura Nahuatl).
- Muñoz Camargo, Diego (1892 (1585)) Historia de Tlaxcala, published and annotated by Alfredo Chavero, Mexico.
- Fargher, Lane F. (2007) In the Shadow of Popocatepetl: Archaeological Survey and Mapping at Tlaxcala, México. FAMSI.
