= Maxixcatl =

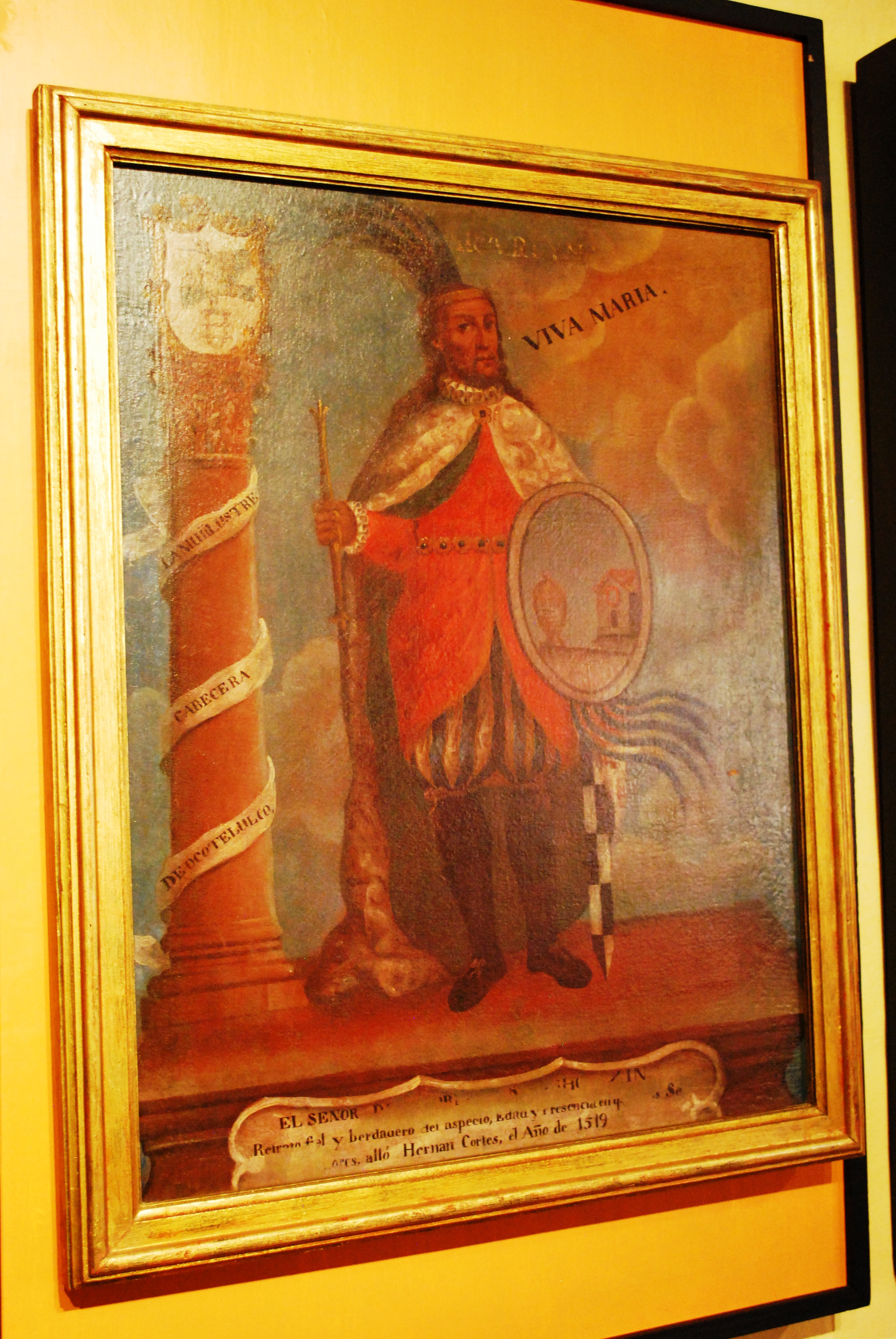
- Painting of Maxixcatzin in Tlaxcala Regional Museum

Tlatoani of Ocotelolco
- Reign: ? - 1520
- Predecessor: Cuitlixcatl
- Successor: Lorenzo Maxixcatl
- Died: 1520
- Issue: Lorenzo Maxixcatl

Maxixcatl (also often given, in its Nahuatl honorific form, as Maxixcatzin) was the tlatoani (ruler) of the Nahua altepetl (city-state) of Ocotelolco, one of the four towns that formed the state of Tlaxcallān. He was one of the main signatories of the alliance with Hernán Cortés during the Spanish conquest of the Aztec Empire.

== Biography ==
Maxixcatzin was instrumental in forming the alliance between Tlaxcallān and the Spanish force of Hernán Cortés against the Aztecs. He gave his daughter Zicuetzin—baptized as Luisa—to Juan Velazquez de Leon, both of whom were killed on La Noche Triste.

Maxixcatl died in the smallpox epidemic which decimated the indigenous population of central Mexico in 1520. He was succeeded by his 13-year-old son Lorenzo Maxixcatl.

== See also ==
- Spanish conquest of the Aztec Empire
- Xicotencatl II
- Xicotencatl the Elder

Preceded by Cuitlixcatl	Tlatoani of Ocotelolco ca. 1500 - 1520	Succeeded by Lorenzo Maxixcatl
