= Lienzo de Tlaxcala =

16th-century Spanish/Mexican colonial document

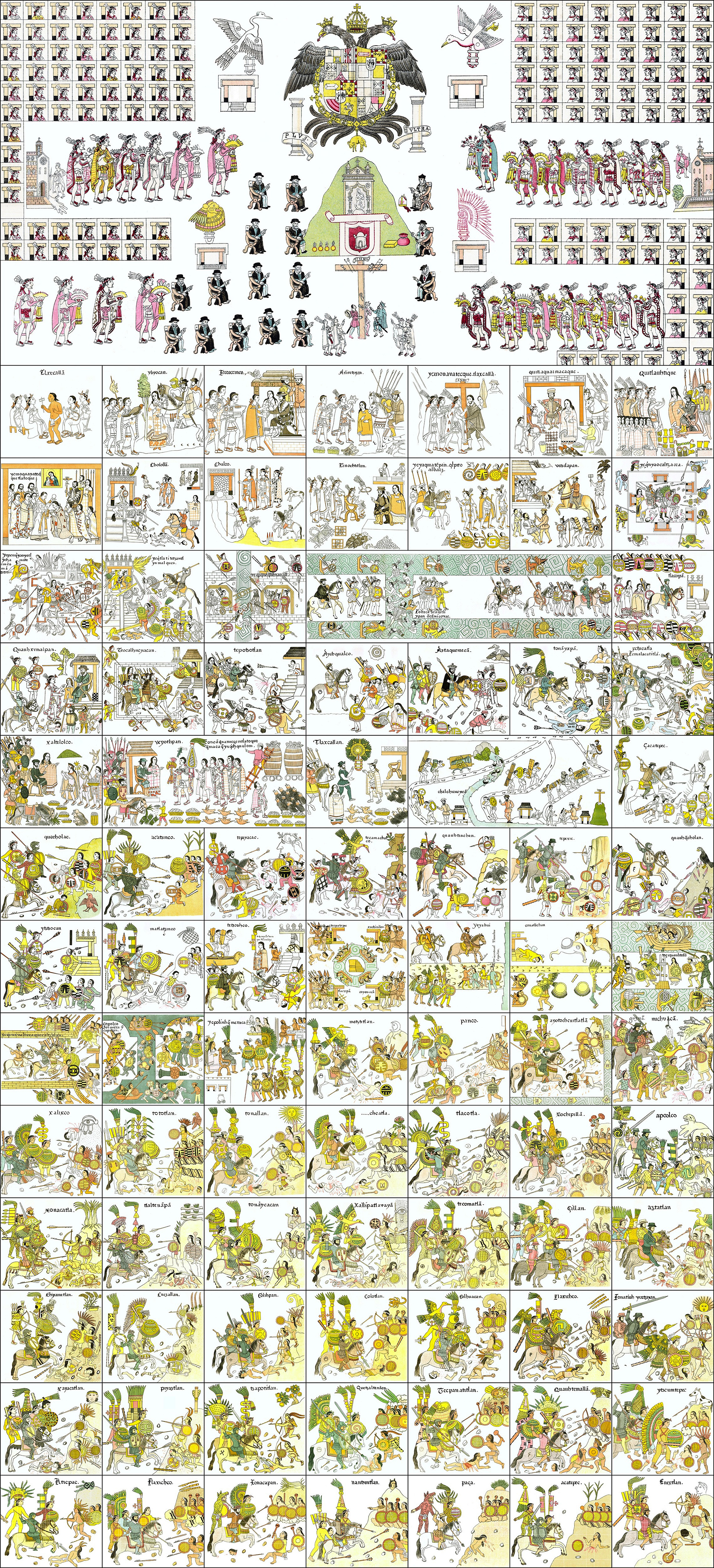
The Lienzo de Tlaxcala, colour copy, 1773.

The Lienzo de Tlaxcala is a Tlaxcalan colonial document produced in the mid-sixteenth century at the request of the Tlaxcalan city council. Measuring 4.8m high and 2m wide, the pictorial document depicts the Spanish conquest of the Aztec Empire between 1519 and 1521 across 87 scenes and emphasises the Tlaxcalan contribution to it.

== Origins ==
The Lienzo de Tlaxcala was produced after the conquest in the mid-sixteenth century by unknown artists, likely indigenous Tlaxcalans, at the request of the Tlaxcalan cabildo. Three copies are known to have been produced: One was sent to King Charles V of Spain, one was sent to Mexico City and one remained in the possession of Tlaxcalan elites. It was produced as an appeal for more rights for the people of Tlaxcala within the Spanish colonial operation in Mexico. The Lienzo uses a combination of indigenous art styles and Spanish script to depict the Conquest of Mexico clearly to these different audiences.

Following the conquest and the establishment of Spanish colonies in the Americas, Tlaxcalans primarily wanted to protect themselves from encomienda, an exploitative labour system used by the Spanish. They mostly did this by adopting Spanish customs and rhetoric more than other indigenous gorups, but they also relied on their role in the conquest to justify getting preferential treatment. The lienzo de Tlaxcala was a justificatory document which acted as a petition to gain these privileges by showing how pivotal their alliance with the Spanish was in conquering the Mexica.

== Content of the Lienzo ==
=== The Spanish Conquest of the Aztec Empire ===
Important events from the Spanish conquest of the Aztec Empire are depicted in the Lienzo de Tlaxcala in chronological order, including the Noche Triste in 1520 and the fall of Tenochtitlan in 1521. The Lienzo de Tlaxcala depicts Tlaxcala as a valuable ally to the Spanish in the conquest of the Aztec Empire, but it doesn't portray a completely historically accurate narrative of the conquest. While it is true that they did ally with the Spanish conquistadors eventually due to their mutual opposition to the Mexica, the lienzo omits the initial battle between the Tlaxcalans and the Spanish conquistadors, instead depicting an alliance form their initial meeting. Historian Matthew Restall has argued that their eventual alliance was motivated by Tlaxcalan desires to defeat the Mexica with help form the Spanish. The hostile meeting between the Spanish conquistadors and the Tlaxcalan warriors is depicted in other sources like the Codex Huamantla.

=== Depiction of Malintzin ===
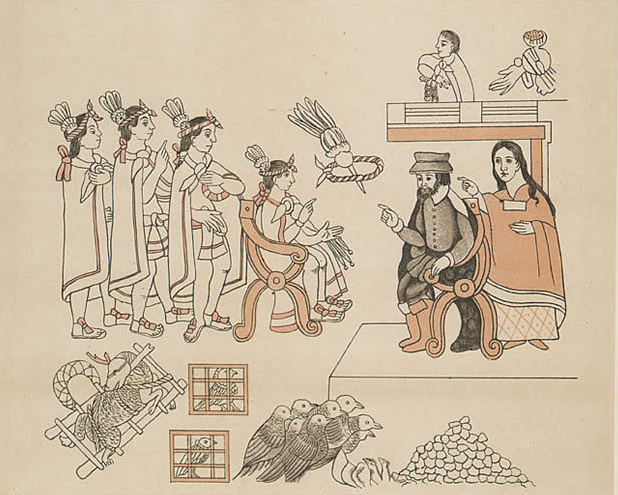
Cortes and Malintzin together in the Lienzo de Tlaxcala.

Historians have noted the unique depiction of Malintzin in the lienzo compared to other colonial sources. Hernán Cortés himself rarely refers to Malintzin in his own letters but he is rarely depicted without Malintzin by his side in the Lienzo de Tlaxcala. Malintzin operated as a translator for Cortes during the conquest and the Tlaxcalans frequently depict her centrally in their images, representing her as an important authority figure. As well as depicting her role as a translator and mediator, the Lienzo de Tlaxcala also depicts Malintzin as a warrior on the battlefield wielding a sword and shield. It is unknown how accurate this portrayal of her is, but its inclusion in the lienzo is indicative of post-conquest beliefs in Tlaxcala about Malintzin and her importance in the Spanish Conquest.

=== Anachronisms ===
There are some anachronisms in the Lienzo de Tlaxcala which indicate it was produced with a Spanish audience in mind. One such of these is the inclusion of European style chairs, which would not have been available to the Spanish during the conquest. Their inclusion in this colonial document has been seen as further evidence of Tlaxcalans adapting to colonial life and culture in the sixteenth century.
