= Estudios de Cultura Náhuatl =

- Discipline: Nahua culture and Nahuatl studies
- Language: Spanish, Nahuatl, English, French
- Edited by: Miguel León-Portilla

Publication details
- History: 1959–present
- Publisher: National Autonomous University of Mexico (Mexico)
- Frequency: Semiannual (annual prior to 2012)
- Open access: yes
- ISO 4: Find out here

Indexing
- ISSN: 0071-1675

Links
- Journal homepage

Estudios de Cultura Náhuatl is a peer-reviewed academic journal specializing in Nahua culture, history, and the Nahuatl language. It is published by the Instituto de Investigaciones Históricas at the National Autonomous University of Mexico (UNAM).

The inaugural issue, containing ten articles, was published in 1959 under the direction of Ángel María Garibay. The journal was issued annually until 2012, when it transitioned to a semiannual publication schedule.

== See also ==
- Nahuatl
- Mesoamerican literature
