= Ixtlilxochitl II =

Aztec noble

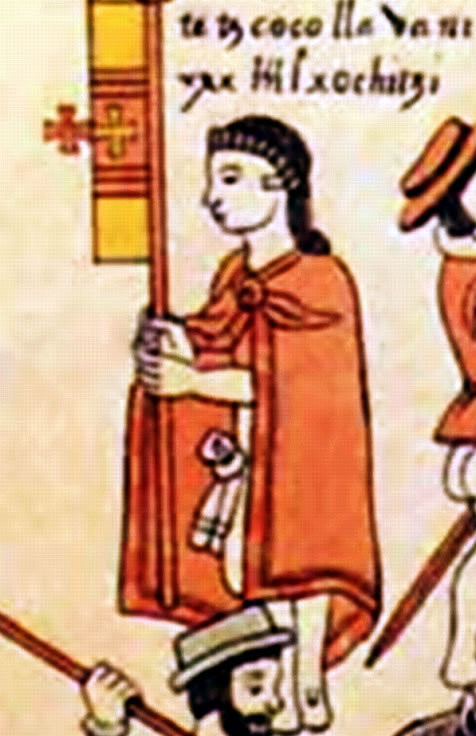
- Depiction of Ixtlilxochitl II from the Lienzo de Tlaxcala

Tlatoani of Texcoco
- Reign: 1521–1531
- Predecessor: Tecocoltzin
- Successor: Yoyontzin
- Died: 1531
- Father: Nezahualpilli

Ixtlilxochitl II (c. 1500–1531) was a Nahua nobleman, tlatoani of Texcoco. He allied with Spain during the Spanish conquest of the Aztec Empire and assisted Hernán Cortés during the Siege of Tenochtitlan. He converted to Christianity under the name of Fernando Cortés Ixtlilxóchitl and ruled Texcoco in Spain's name until his death.

== Biography ==
=== In the Aztec Empire ===
According to his descendant Fernando de Alva Cortés Ixtlilxóchitl, Ixtlilxochitl was a child prodigy, who being only three years old killed a female servant caught in an infidelity and then justified his act according to Texcocan law. At twelve he led a violent purge of courtiers who had advised his father to execute him for the danger he posed, and by fourteen he was already a renowned captain in the wars against Tlaxcala and Atlixco.

In 1516 Nezahualpilli died, and the succession was contested by several of his sons, including Cacamatzin and Ixtlilxochitl. The former gained the support of Moctezuma II, Tlatoani of the Aztec Empire. A civil war ensued, and ended in a tripartite division of Tetzcoco, by which one third of the kingdom, with the capital, was awarded to Cacamatzin, the northern part to his brother Ixtlilxochitl, and the third part to another claimant to the throne. Ixtlilxochitl became from that time the enemy of Moctezuma II.

=== Spanish conquest ===
On the arrival of the Spaniards, he sent an embassy to Hernán Cortés while he was at Tlaxcala, offering him his services and asking his aid in return. A joint army marched on the eastern side of the lake. Cacamatzin fled and was eventually deposed. Ixtlilxochitl eventually took the throne of all of Tetzcoco, but was now allied with Tlaxcala and the Spaniards against Tenochtitlan, its former ally. Ixtlilxochitl led Tetzcocan armies throughout the Spanish-Aztec Wars. His important services have been commemorated by the historians, who have given him significant credit in the conquest of Tenochtitlan.

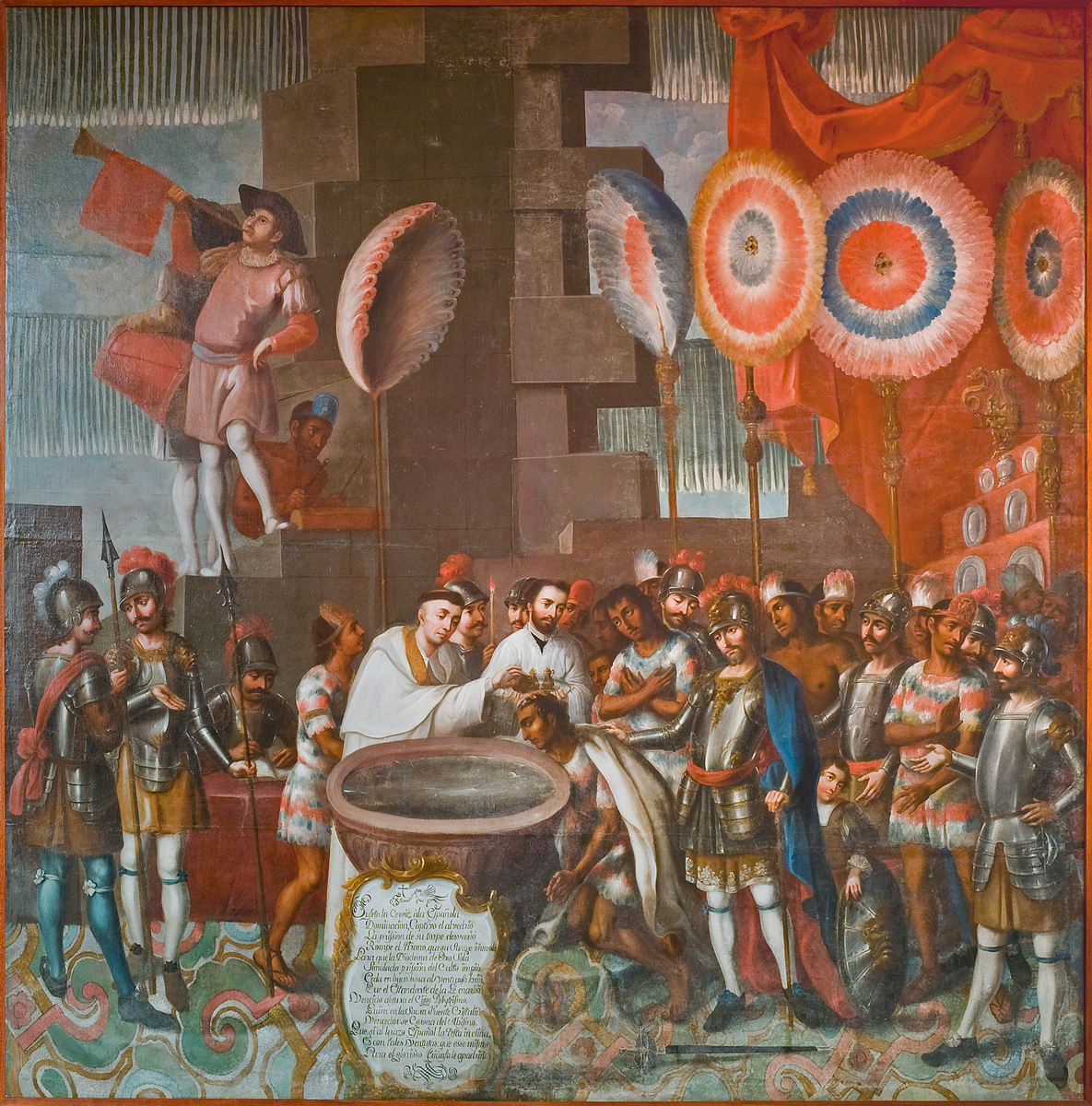
Baptism of Ixtlilxochitl by José Vivar y Valderrama, 18th century.

After the defeat of Tenochtitlan, he was baptised and took the name of Hernan Cortés, after that of the conquistador, who was his godfather on this occasion. Afterward he took great interest in the propagation of Christianity, and supposedly brought in a bag the first stones to build the church of the convent of San Francisco in the city of Mexico. He accompanied Cortés on his expedition to Honduras in 1525 on which Cuauhtémoc was hanged for an alleged plot against Cortés. Ixtlilxochitl survived the expedition and probably returned overland to Central Mexico.

He threatened the people of Texcoco, including his mother Yacotzin, to convert to Christianity or be killed.

In the 17th century, Fernando de Alva Cortés Ixtlilxóchitl, his great-great-grandson, penned a history of Tetzcoco called the 13th relation of the Historical Compendium of the Kingdom of Texcoco, which defended Ixtlilxochitl and his actions. This history provides one of the most important indigenous views of the Spanish conquest of the Aztec Empire. The source presents Ixtlilxochitl as a central player in the war. In order to gain rights and privileges from the Spanish monarch, whose power had grown much over the previous century, it is careful to depict Ixtlilxochitl as one of the first converts to Christianity in the Americas.

Preceded by Tecocoltzin	Tlatoani of Texcoco; 1521–1531	Succeeded by Yoyontzin
