= Ocotelolco =

Polity in pre-Columbian Mexico

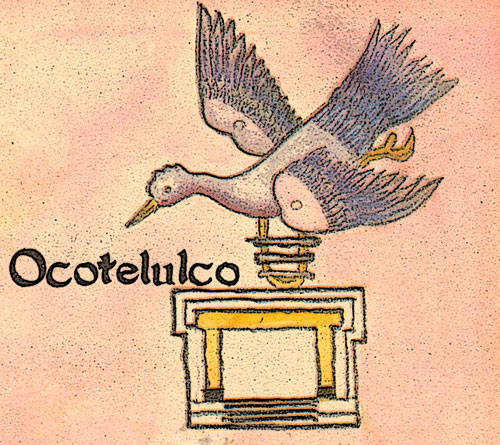
Glyph for Ocotelolco

Ocotelolco (sometimes spelled Ocotelulco), in pre-Columbian Mexico, was one of the four independent altepetl (polities) that constituted the confederation of Tlaxcallan. The site is in the present day state of Tlaxcala in central Mexico.

== History ==
Ocotelolco was the second of the four altepetl to be founded. At the time of the Spanish conquest of Mexico it was, along with Tizatlan, the most powerful of the four allied communities. Where Ocotelolco held the economical power, having the main market in the region, Tizatlan had the military power and commanded the Tlaxcallan armies.

When the Spanish arrived in Mexico Ocotelolco was ruled by Maxixcatzin. Through a series of political events Ocotelolco finally achieved dominance over Tizatlan at the end of the conquest.

== Excavations ==
Excavations at the site in 1990-1991 carried out by the Instituto Nacional de Antropología (INAH) exposed a room with a painted altar and bench (47 cm high extending 8 meters along the room's north wall). The painted frieze closely resembles the Codex Borgia in style. The bench features a series of alternating skulls, human hearts, hands, and shields while eight anthropomorphic serpents descend on three sides of the altar, surrounding a central image of a deity (identified as Tezcatlipoca) surrounded by a frame of flint knives, similar in its composition to the image on plate 32 of the Codex Borgia.
