= List of radio stations in Tlaxcala =

Tlaxcala has the fewest radio stations of any Mexican state.

== List of stations ==
Call sign	Frequency	Location	Concessionaire	Name	Format
XECCBI-AM	1370 kHz	Huamantla	Jorge Aguilar Iván Velázquez	La Más Peligrosa	Regional Mexican
XETT-AM	1430 kHz	Tlaxcala	Government of the State of Tlaxcala (Voz e Imagen de Tlaxcala, S.A. de C.V.)	Radio Tlaxcala	Public radio
XHCAL-FM	94.3 MHz	Calpulalpan	Government of the State of Tlaxcala	Radio Calpulalpan	Public radio
XHTLAX-FM	96.5 MHz	Tlaxcala	Government of the State of Tlaxcala (Radio Altiplano FM, S.A. de C.V.)	Radio Altiplano	Public radio
XHSCFG-FM	99.1 MHz	San Bartolomé Cuahuixmatlac	Xochitl Teotlac, A.C.	—	—
XHSCKJ-FM	100.7 MHz	San Bartolomé Matlalohcan	Radiodifusora DEG-CAR, A.C.	—	—
XHUATX-FM	99.5 MHz	Tlaxcala	Universidad Autónoma de Tlaxcala	Radio Universidad	University radio
XHSCFF-FM	106.3 MHz	Tlaxcala	Ehecatlahtol, A.C.	Ehecatlahtol	Community radio
XHXZ-FM	100.3 MHz	Apizaco	Frecuencia Modulada de Apizaco, S.A. de C.V.	FM Centro	Regional Mexican
XHHT-FM	106.9 MHz	Huamantla	Radio Huamantla, S.A. de C.V.	Radio Huamantla	Full-service
