= List of television stations in Tlaxcala =

The following is a list of all IFT-licensed over-the-air television stations broadcasting in the Mexican state of Tlaxcala.

The only standalone stations licensed within Tlaxcala are the five transmitters in Tlaxcala Televisión, the state network of Tlaxcala, which broadcasts on virtual channel 10. Most television service in Tlaxcala is offered by repeaters of stations in Puebla and on Altzomoni, Estado de México.

== List of television stations ==
RF	VC	Call sign	Location	Network/name	ERP	Concessionaire
22	10	XHTXB-TDT	Apizaco	Tlaxcala Televisión	7.26 kW	Gobierno del Estado de Tlaxcala
31	10	XHTCL-TDT	Calpulalpan	Tlaxcala Televisión	1.5 kW	Gobierno del Estado de Tlaxcala
23	10	XHTXM-TDT	Huamantla	Tlaxcala Televisión	3.77 kW	Gobierno del Estado de Tlaxcala
22	10	XHSPM-TDT	San Pablo del Monte	Tlaxcala Televisión	3.94 kW	Gobierno del Estado de Tlaxcala
23	10	XHTLX-TDT	Tlaxcala	Tlaxcala Televisión	7.26 kW	Gobierno del Estado de Tlaxcala
