= 1430 AM =

AM radio frequency

The following radio stations broadcast on AM frequency 1430 kHz: 1430 AM is a regional broadcast frequency, as classified by the U.S. Federal Communications Commission and the Canadian Radio-television and Telecommunications Commission.

== Argentina ==
- LRI235 in Balcarce, Buenos Aires
- LT24 in San Nicolas de los Arroyos, Buenos Aires
- LV26 in Rio Tercero, Cordoba

== Canada ==
- CHKT in Toronto, Ontario - 50 kW, transmitter located at 43.6175°N 79.379444°W

== Guatemala (Channel 90) ==
- TGAG in Huehuetenango

== Mexico ==
- XETT-AM in Tlaxcala de Xicohténcatl, Tlaxcala
- XEWD-AM in Ciudad Miguel Alemán, Tamaulipas

== United States ==
Call sign	City of license	Facility ID	Class	Daytime power (kW)	Nighttime power (kW)	Unlimited power (kW)	Transmitter coordinates
KALV	Alva, Oklahoma	43280	B	0.5	0.5		36.818333°N 98.643889°W
KAMP	Aurora, Colorado	67843	B	10	5		39.563056°N 104.929444°W
KASI	Ames, Iowa	2116	D	1	0.032		42.038333°N 93.681389°W
KBRC	Mount Vernon, Washington	39496	B	5	1		48.422778°N 122.354167°W
KBRK	Brookings, South Dakota	15263	D	1	0.1		44.303333°N 96.766944°W
KCLK	Asotin, Washington	11722	B	5	1		46.316389°N 117.04°W
KEES	Gladewater, Texas	72781	B	5	1		32.529444°N 94.880556°W
KFIG	Fresno, California	26592	B			5	36.890833°N 119.658333°W
KJAY	Sacramento, California	65226	D	0.5	0.02		38.504722°N 121.560833°W
KKOZ	Ava, Missouri	35030	D	0.5	0.02		36.93°N 92.655278°W
KMES	Ogden, Utah	35069	B	25	5		41.046944°N 112.026944°W
KMRB	San Gabriel, California	52913	B	50	9.8		34.118889°N 118.081667°W
KMRC	Morgan City, Louisiana	67681	D	0.5			29.750833°N 91.173333°W
KNSP	Staples, Minnesota	30016	D	1	0.199		46.359444°N 94.781944°W
KRGI	Grand Island, Nebraska	32382	D	5	0.021		40.871389°N 98.274167°W
KROL	Carrollton, Missouri	33387	D	0.5	0.027		39.332778°N 93.5375°W
KSHJ	Houston, Texas	33737	B	5	1		29.755833°N 95.276944°W (daytime); 29.755556°N 95.276944°W (nighttime)
KTBZ	Tulsa, Oklahoma	68293	B	25	5		36.236667°N 95.955278°W
KVHZ	Wasilla, Alaska	161023	B	1	1		61.618333°N 149.286111°W
KVVN	Santa Clara, California	28438	B	1	2.5		37.329722°N 121.866111°W
KWST	El Centro, California	33298	D	1	0.036		32.8075°N 115.538333°W
KYKN	Keizer, Oregon	72474	B	5	5		44.926667°N 122.955278°W
WBEV	Beaver Dam, Wisconsin	4475	B	1	1		43.428611°N 88.8925°W
WBLR	Batesburg, South Carolina	17764	D	5	0.163		33.880278°N 81.554444°W
WCLT	Newark, Ohio	71284	D	0.5	0.048		40.033889°N 82.402222°W
WCMY	Ottawa, Illinois	70305	D	0.5	0.038		41.348056°N 88.804167°W
WDAL	Dalton, Georgia	54518	D	2.1	0.075		34.789722°N 84.953333°W
WDEX	Monroe, North Carolina	22028	B	2.5	2.5		34.984444°N 80.603889°W
WDJS	Mount Olive, North Carolina	43909	B	10	5		35.200278°N 78.123056°W
WEEF	Deerfield, Illinois	72957	B	1.6	0.75		42.139444°N 87.885278°W
WEIR	Weirton, West Virginia	40873	B	1	1		40.445°N 80.628056°W
WENE	Endicott, New York	19625	B	5	5		42.082222°N 76.031389°W
WFHK	Pell City, Alabama	62109	D	5			33.586111°N 86.326389°W
WFOB	Fostoria, Ohio	67699	B	1	1		41.101667°N 83.399722°W
WHAN	Ashland, Virginia	8438	D	1	0.031		37.746111°N 77.495556°W
WION	Ionia, Michigan	39533	B	4.7	0.33		43.004444°N 85.085833°W
WKOX	Everett, Massachusetts	53964	D	2.5	0.026		42.403056°N 71.074722°W
WLCB	Buffalo, Kentucky	40213	D	1	0.042		37.530278°N 85.713611°W
WLKF	Lakeland, Florida	10341	B	5	1		28.040833°N 81.935556°W
WLTG	Upper Grand Lagoon, Florida	27694	D	0.125	0.06		30.178889°N 85.781944°W
WMNC	Morganton, North Carolina	13833	D	2.7	0.046		35.7525°N 81.721944°W
WNAV	Annapolis, Maryland	19554	B	5	1		38.983333°N 76.5225°W
WNEL	Caguas, Puerto Rico	68355	B	5	5		18.248056°N 66.023611°W
WNSW	Newark, New Jersey	73332	B	10	7		40.849722°N 74.183056°W
WOIR	Homestead, Florida	13776	B	5	0.5		25.452222°N 80.516944°W
WOWW	Germantown, Tennessee	21728	B	2.5	2.5		35.213889°N 89.796111°W
WRDN	Durand, Wisconsin	65633	D	2	0.152		44.581389°N 91.9125°W
WRMG	Red Bay, Alabama	55419	D	1			34.414167°N 88.136389°W
WRXO	Roxboro, North Carolina	57790	D	1			36.367778°N 78.999444°W
WTMN	Gainesville, Florida	23022	D	10	0.045		29.623889°N 82.288611°W
WTNA	Altoona, Pennsylvania	47089	D	5	0.025		40.495°N 78.401667°W
WXNT	Indianapolis, Indiana	47145	B	5	5		39.838333°N 86.198889°W
WYGI	Madison, Tennessee	21473	D	10	0.03		36.271944°N 86.714722°W
WYKG	Covington, Georgia	54551	B	3.9	0.212		33.620556°N 84.884444°W
WYMC	Mayfield, Kentucky	30619	B	1	1		36.786667°N 88.654444°W

== Uruguay ==
- CW-25 in Durazno, Durazno.
