= Heroic City =

Title bestowed on cities in Mexico

Heroic City (Spanish: Ciudad Heroica) is a title bestowed on cities of Mexico in recognition of some historical event in defence of national sovereignty or the republican and federal form of government. The title may be granted by either state congresses or the Congress of the Union. The cities of Atlixco, Puebla de Zaragoza and Veracruz have received this distinction several times.

In 2006, a commission was established to document information about 35 Mexican cities recognized as heroic. Since then, the count has increased to over 40 towns and cities bearing the designation "Heroic" in their names. These cities earned their heroic status due to their significant involvement in key wars throughout Mexican history.

The wars include the Mexican War of Independence (1810–1821), the First French Intervention (1838–1839), the Mexican–American War (1846–1848), the Caste War of Yucatán (1847–1901), the Second French Intervention (1861–1867), the Mexican Revolution (1910–1920), and other notable battles. For a battle to be considered heroic, it must have made a substantial impact on the Mexican side of the conflict, representing a pivotal moment in the country's history.

== List of Heroic Cities ==
City	State	Award date	Reason
Alvarado	Veracruz	23 December 1957	Defence during the Mexican–American War
Atlixco	Puebla	26 November 1998	Battle of Atlixco (1848)
Atlixco	Puebla	26 November 1998	Battle of Atlixco (1862)
Caborca	Sonora	17 April 1948	Defence against the filibuster Henry Crabb (1857)
Cárdenas	Tabasco	1868	Defence against the Second French Intervention
Calpulalpan	Tlaxcala	19 October 2015	Battle of Calpulalpan (1867)
Cananea	Sonora	30 May 2006	Cananea strike (1906)
Chiapa de Corzo	Chiapas	2008	Battle of Chiapa de Corzo (1863)
Chihuahua	Chihuahua	26 March 2025	Battle of Chihuahua (1866)
Córdoba	Veracruz	1880	Treaties of Córdoba (1821)
Coscomatepec	Veracruz	18 April 1980	Siege of Coscomatepec (1813)
Cosoleacaque	Veracruz	18 October 1977	Battle of Cosoleacaque (1863)
Cuautla	Morelos	4 April 1829	Siege of Cuautla (1812)
Ejutla de Crespo	Oaxaca	24 December 1866	Insurgency of Manuel Sabino Crespo (1812)
Guaymas	Sonora	5 November 1935	Battle of Guaymas (1854)
Huajuapan de León	Oaxaca	26 August 1997	Siege of Huajuapan (1812)
Huamantla	Tlaxcala	12 August 1953	Battle of Huamantla (1847)
Juchitán de Zaragoza	Oaxaca	2006	Battle of Juchitán (1866)
Matamoros	Tamaulipas	1851	Defence against the filibuster José María Carbajal (1851)
Mulegé	Baja California Sur	2 October 1980	Battle of Mulegé (1847)
Nochistlán	Zacatecas	13 May 2015	Battle of Nochistlán (1864)
Nogales	Sonora	1961	Battle of Ambos Nogales (1918)
Puebla de Zaragoza	Puebla	25 September 1862	Battle of Puebla (1862)
Puebla de Zaragoza	Puebla	23 April 2014	Siege of Puebla (1863)
Puebla de Zaragoza	Puebla	23 April 2014	Third Battle of Puebla (1867)
Puebla de Zaragoza	Puebla	23 April 2014	Uprising of the Serdán family (1910)
Tacámbaro	Michoacán	5 April 2011	Battle of Tacámbaro (1865)
Teapa	Tabasco	28 February 1830	Defence against the First Invasion of Los Chenes
Tecomán	Colima	2 September 2016	Battles of Tecomán (1522)
Tenancingo	State of Mexico	2 October 2021	Battle of Tenancingo (1812)
Tenango de Arista	State of Mexico	19 October 1868	Independence of Mexico
Tijuana	Baja California	22 June 2011	Battle of Tijuana (1911)
Tlapacoyan	Veracruz	27 February 1869	Battle of Tlapacoyan (1865)
Tlaxiaco	Oaxaca	23 November 1884	Battle of Cerro Encantado (1814)
Ures	Sonora	5 September 1998	Defence against the Second French Intervention
Veracruz	Veracruz	29 July 1826	Capture of the fortress of San Juan de Ulúa (1825)
Veracruz	Veracruz	1898	Defence against the First French Intervention
Veracruz	Veracruz	1898	Defence during the Mexican–American War
Veracruz	Veracruz	1948	Defence against the U.S. occupation of Veracruz (1914)
Zitácuaro	Michoacán	20 April 1868	Zitácuaro Council (1811)
Zacatecas	Zacatecas	23 June 2010	Battle of Zacatecas (1914)
Zacatlán	Puebla	24 October 2017	Insurgency of José Francisco Osorno

== See also ==
- Hero City, similar distinctions in some other nations
