= XETT-AM =

Radio station in Tlaxcala, Tlaxcala

- Tlaxcala, Tlaxcala; Mexico
- Frequency: 1430 AM
- Branding: Radio Tlaxcala

Programming
- Format: Regional Mexican

Ownership
- Owner: Government of the State of Tlaxcala; (Voz e Imagen de Tlaxcala, S.A. de C.V.)
- Operator: CORACYT
- Sister stations: XHTLAX-FM; XHTLX-TDT; XHCAL-FM (Calpulalpan)

History
- First air date: August 7, 1974
- Call sign meaning: Tlaxcala City, Tlaxcala

Technical information
- Class: B
- Power: 5,000 watts daytime 1,000 watts nighttime

Links
- Webcast: Listen live
- Website: radiotlaxcala1430.mx

XETT-AM is a radio station on 1430 AM in Tlaxcala, Tlaxcala. It is owned by the government of the state of Tlaxcala through concessionaire Voz e Imagen de Tlaxcala, S.A. de C.V. It carries a Regional Mexican format.

It is part of CORACYT, the radio and television organization of Tlaxcala, along with Tlaxcala Televisión, XHCAL-FM 94.3 in Calpulalpan and XHTLAX-FM 96.5 the city of Tlaxcala.

== History ==
XETT-AM logo until 2016

XETT received its concession on July 19, 1974. It was owned by Raúl Romero Rivera and Alfonso Macías Galáviz and broadcast as a daytimer on 1430 kHz with 500 watts. Both had helped to found XEHT in Huamantla, while Macías Galáviz also founded XHXZ-FM in Apizaco.

In October 1984, Romero and Macías solicited the transfer of XETT from their ownership to Voz e Imagen de Tlaxcala, a state-owned company. The transfer of the concession took nearly 28 years to consummate. By this time, Macías Galáviz had died, with Jorge Macías Laylle remaining the executor of his estate.
