= XHTLX-TDT =

- Tlaxcala, Tlaxcala; Mexico
- Channels: Digital: 23; Virtual: 10
- Branding: Tlaxcala Televisión

Programming
- Affiliations: Canal Once; Canal 22; Mexiquense Televisión; DW-TV

Ownership
- Owner: Coordinación de Radio, Cine y Televisión de Tlaxcala; (Gobierno del Estado de Tlaxcala)
- Sister stations: XETT-AM, XHCAL-FM, XHTLAX-FM

Technical information
- Licensing authority: CRT
- ERP: 7.26 kW
- Translator(s): see below

Links
- Website: www.tlaxcalatelevision.tv

Tlaxcala Televisión is a public television station operated by the Coordinación de Radio, Cine y Televisión de Tlaxcala (CORACYT) which serves the Mexican state of Tlaxcala. Tlaxcala Televisión's programming primarily consists of cultural and educational content, along with news and sports coverage. It also airs programming from Canal Once, Canal 22, Mexiquense Televisión and DW-TV

TDT was founded in the early 1980s and traces its roots to the breakup of Televisión Rural de México, which operated a channel 12 in Tlaxcala.

In the 1990s, the state television station ceased all local production; this returned in 2000.

In the late 2000s through to 2017, the state network was known as "TDT, La Televisión de Tlaxcala", predating the conversion of the network to digital television, or televisión digital terrestre. All digital stations in Mexico carry the -TDT suffix. The state network renamed to Tlaxcala Televisión in 2017.

== Transmitters ==
Tlaxcala Televisión uses a network of five terrestrial television transmitters to provide statewide coverage. Its transmitters are the only television stations licensed directly to Tlaxcala.

RF	VC	Call sign	Location	ERP
22	10	XHTXB-TDT	Apizaco	7.26 kW
31	10	XHTCL-TDT	Calpulalpan	1.5 kW
23	10	XHTXM-TDT	Huamantla	3.77 kW
22	10	XHSPM-TDT	San Pablo del Monte	3.94 kW
23	10	XHTLX-TDT	Tlaxcala	7.26 kW

Except for XHSPM and XHTCL, the state network went digital-only on December 31, 2015. The San Pablo del Monte and Calpulalpan stations converted on December 15, 2016.

In February 2017, XHTLX was approved to move from channel 22 to 23 by the IFT.
