= San José Xicohténcatl =

- Location within Tlaxcala Location within Mexico
- Coordinates: 19.353°N 97.830°W
- Time zone: UTC-6

San José Xicohténcatl is a town of some 6,000 people in the municipality of Huamantla, in the eastern part of the Mexican state of Tlaxcala. It is about 7 km northeast of the city of Huamantla on the railroad from Jalapa to Puebla.
