= WMNC =

WMNC may refer to:

- WMNC (AM), a radio station (1430 AM) licensed to Morganton, North Carolina, United States
- WMNC-FM, a radio station (92.1 FM) licensed to Morganton, North Carolina, United States
