= Hero City =

Hero City may refer to:

- Hero City (Soviet Union), awarded 1965–1985 to cities now in Belarus, Russia, and Ukraine
- Hero City of Ukraine, awarded 2022
- Hero Cities of Yugoslavia, awarded 1970–1975

== See also ==
- Heroic City, title used in Mexico
- City of Heroes, online game
