= Codex Huamantla =

1592 Otomi book

The Codex Huamantla also known as the Codex of Huamantla and Códice de Huamantla is an Otomi codex. It contains the work of two artists, and is believed to have been completed in 1592 Common Era. The first artist depicts the story migration of the Otomi people from Chiapan to Huamantla during the Post-Classical period. A second artist later depicted the Otomi's participation in the conquest of the Aztec Empire and life under Spanish domination. Seven fragments of the codex are currently held in Mexico's National Museum of Anthropology and History, and two fragments are in Germany's Deutsche Staatsbibliothek.

== The Codex ==
The center of the painting depicts the migration of a group of Otomi people from Chiapan to Huamantla, under the protection of the goddess Xochiquétzal and of Otontecuhtli, lord of the Otomi and of fire. The work depicts the path taken by the pilgrims with footsteps and the places marked by toponymic glyphs and in some cases by their founding myths. Tenochtitlan, the Aztec capital is represented with its glyph and tutelary god, possibly Huitzilopochtli.

A second pictograph was made above the first by a different artist. It shows the participation of the Otomi in the conquest of the Aztec Empire and the lives of the Otomi under Spanish domination. Fragments of the codex include a Franciscan monastery, church and a friar believed to depict Pedro Melendez, who initiated the construction of the buildings in 1570.

== Date of creation ==
The exact date of the original work is unknown, but the addition of the second part by a different artist is presumed to have been completed in 1592. The work contains a line in Nahuatl which is read in Spanish as "Aquí llegó el capitán hace setenta y tres años". This is a direct reference to Hernán Cortés and the passage of seventy-three years, which indicates the year was 1592. It is presumed that because this portion is on the edge of the work that was added last.

== Fragments ==
The manuscript consists of several fragments with several of portion having been lost. The codex is made of bark paper which was painted. The original work measures 8.5 meters long and 1.90 meters wide. Seven of the fragments are in Mexico's National Museum of Anthropology and History and the remaining two fragments are in the Deutsche Staatsbibliothek in Berlin, Germany.
