= XHTLAX-FM =

Radio station in Tlaxcala, Tlaxcala, Mexico

- Tlaxcala, Tlaxcala; Mexico
- Frequency: 96.5 FM
- Branding: Radio Altiplano

Programming
- Format: Spanish adult hits

Ownership
- Owner: Government of the State of Tlaxcala; (Radio Altiplano FM, S.A. de C.V.)
- Operator: CORACYT
- Sister stations: XETT-AM; XHTLX-TDT; XHCAL-FM (Calpulalpan)

History
- First air date: March 11, 1986
- Call sign meaning: TLAXcala

Technical information
- ERP: 20 kW

Links
- Webcast: Listen live
- Website: radioaltiplano.mx

XHTLAX-FM is a radio station in Tlaxcala, Tlaxcala. It is owned by the government of the state of Tlaxcala and known as Radio Altiplano, carrying a Spanish-language adult hits format.

It is also part of CORACYT, the radio and television organization of Tlaxcala, along with Tlaxcala Televisión, XETT-AM 1430 in the city of Tlaxcala and XHCAL-FM 94.3 in Calpulalpan.

== History ==
Radio Altiplano was officially signed on March 11, 1986, under an agreement made between the state government and IMER. IMER exited the partnership in 1991 due to budget cuts during the government of Carlos Salinas de Gortari. However, the concession history for Radio Altiplano was only beginning in 1991, as that year, the SCT made 96.5 MHz available in Tlaxcala with the XHTLAX-FM callsign. Radio Altiplano FM, S.A. de C.V., would receive the concession on October 21, 1994. Between September, 29, 2023 and June 11, 2024 the station was branded as El Heraldo Radio Altiplano.
