= XHXZ-FM =

Radio station in Apizaco, Tlaxcala, Mexico

- Apizaco, Tlaxcala; Mexico
- Frequency: 100.3 FM
- Branding: FM Centro

Programming
- Format: Regional Mexican

Ownership
- Owner: Frecuencia Modulada de Apizaco, S.A. de C.V.

History
- First air date: December 17, 1980

Technical information
- ERP: 20.711 kW

Links
- Webcast: Listen live
- Website: fmcentro.mx

XHXZ-FM is a radio station in Apizaco, Tlaxcala. Broadcasting on 100.3 FM, it is owned by Frecuencia Modulada de Apizaco and known as FM Centro, carrying a Regional Mexican format.

== History ==
XHXZ officially came to the air on December 17, 1980, becoming the first FM station in the state of Tlaxcala and just the third broadcasting station in the entire state. Alfonso Macias Galáviz, who had a hand in founding the other two — XEHT-AM and XETT-AM — had been seeking a station for the town since 1977 and finally brought it to air. In April 1981, XHXZ received its concession and was formally opened by Governor Tulio Hernández Gómez. The original concessionaire was Rubén Contreras Santiago, who transferred control to a new corporation in 1988.
