= XHCAL-FM =

Radio station in Calpulalpan, Tlaxcala

- Calpulalpan, Tlaxcala; Mexico
- Frequency: 94.3 MHz
- Branding: Radio Calpulalpan

Programming
- Format: Regional Mexican

Ownership
- Owner: Government of the State of Tlaxcala
- Operator: CORACYT
- Sister stations: XHTLX-TDT; XETT-AM; XHTLAX-FM (Tlaxcala)

History
- First air date: February 24, 1990
- Call sign meaning: CALpulalpan

Technical information
- Class: B1
- ERP: 15 kW
- Transmitter coordinates: 19°35′25″N 98°33′08.3″W

Links
- Webcast: Listen live
- Website: radiocalpulapan.com

XHCAL-FM is a radio station on 94.3 FM in Calpulalpan, Tlaxcala. It is owned by the government of the state of Tlaxcala and known as Radio Calpulalpan, carrying a Regional Mexican format.

It is also part of CORACYT, the radio and television organization of Tlaxcala, along with Tlaxcala Televisión as well as XETT-AM 1430 and XHTLAX-FM 96.5, both in the city of Tlaxcala.

XHCAL was officially put on air by the state government in 1990 as part of a bid to promote Tlaxcalan identity among the residents of the northeast corner in the state.
