= LT24 =

Radio station in San Nicolás de los Arroyos, Argentina

Radio San Nicolás (LT24)
San Nicolás de los Arroyos, Buenos Aires Province; Argentina
- Frequency: 1430 kHz

Ownership
- Owner: Producciones Argentinas

History
- Founded: February 16, 1963 (closed circuit)
- First air date: October 10, 1969

Technical information
- Transmitter coordinates: 33°20′04″S 60°13′31.5″W

Links
- Website: LT24

LT24 Radio San Nicolás is a radio station on 1430 AM in San Nicolás de los Arroyos, Argentina.

== History ==
In 1963, Radio San Nicolás began broadcasting as a closed circuit station to some 6,000 households in the town center of San Nicolás de los Arroyos, the first such station in Argentina. After frequencies were put out for bid on the AM band, Radio San Nicolás became an AM station and began broadcasting on October 10, 1969, making it one of the oldest stations in regional Argentina.

In 2013, control of Radio San Nicolás and its sister station on 88.3 FM changed hands.
