= Desiderio Hernández Xochitiotzin =

Mexican artist

- Born: February 11, 1922; San Bernardino Contla, Tlaxcala
- Died: September 14, 2007 (aged 85); Tlaxcala
- Occupation: Muralist

Desiderio Hernández Xochitiotzin (born San Bernardino Contla, February 11, 1922 – died Tlaxcala, September 14, 2007) was a Mexican artist best known for his large-scale mural work inside the State Government Palace in the state of Tlaxcala, Mexico, the last large scale mural of the Mexican muralism movement.

== Life ==
Desiderio Hernández Xochitiotzin was born in Santa María Tlacatecpac de San Bernardino Contla, Tlaxcala in 1922. His artistic training began in his family's handcraft shop and then at the Academia de Bellas Artes de Puebla. After traveling in various parts of Mexico and Europe to live and work, he returned permanently in Tlaxcala in 1957. The rest of his career was dedicated to painting the history and culture of his home state.

He died of respiratory failure on September 14, 2007. Before his death, he planned along with his daughter Citlalli to form a foundation named after him, with the aim of preserving his work and authenticate his artistic production. His daughter currently heads the organization whose activities include social and cultural events and research about the painter. The foundation sponsored an exhibit of his work in the United States in 2011.

== The mural at the State Government Palace in Tlaxcala ==
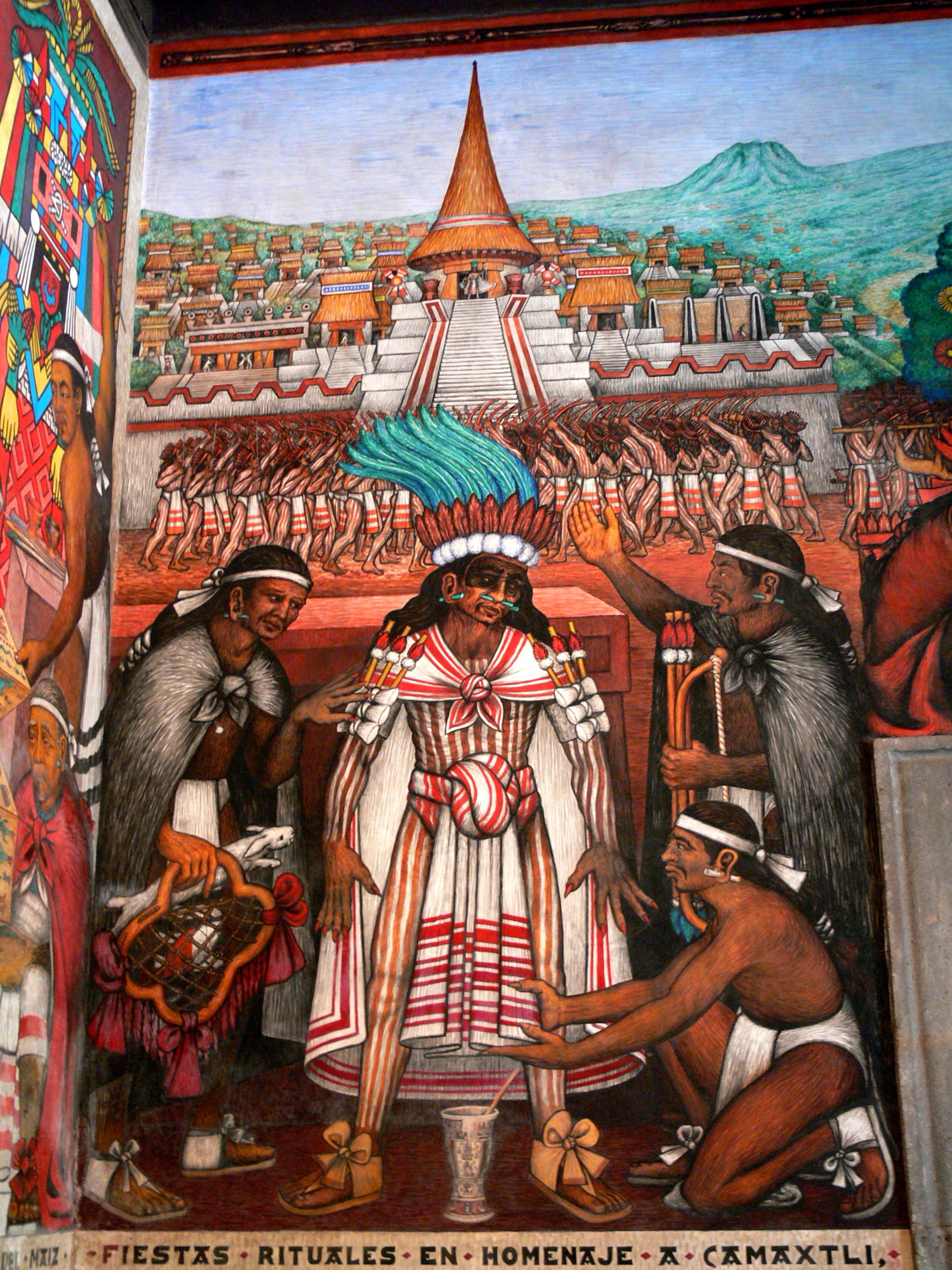
Section of State Palace mural depicting the emperor Camaxtli.

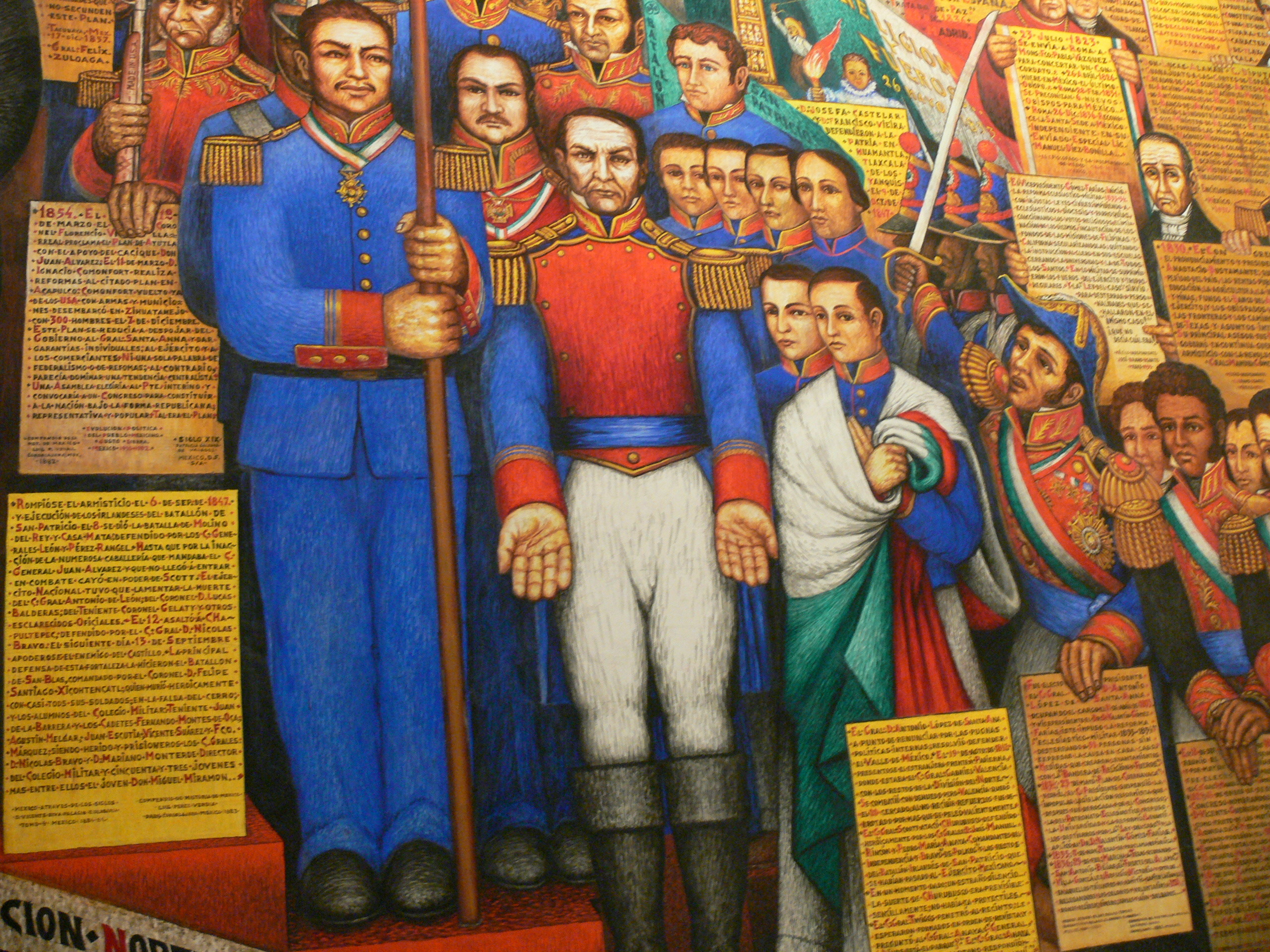
Section of the mural post Independence

Hernández Xochitiotzin's most important work was the creation of the mural La historia de Tlaxcala y su contribución a lo mexicano (The history of Tlaxcala and its contribution to Mexican identity) inside the State Government Palace of Tlaxcala. The project to create a mural that tells the history of Tlaxcala was promoted to the state by poet Miguel N. Lira and preparation work was begun in 1957. The first section, La Conquista, was painted between 1967 and 1968, with work continuing in stages over four decades. The work shows influence from Rivera's mural at the National Palace, but Hernández Xochitiotzin did not paint the original Tlaxcalans as traitors for their role in the Spanish conquest of the Aztec Empire. The entire mural covers over 500 meters squared and is the last grand-scale mural to be created as part of the Mexican muralism movement. However, the work was never fully completed before his death in 2007. Before this time, Hernández Xochitiotzin's asked state authorities to allow his son, Cuauhtlatohuac H. Xochitiotzin to continue the work on the mural but the state never responded.

The mural is one of the most important cultural and tourist attractions of the state, bringing visitors from Mexico and abroad. However, the mural work has been damaged due to the effects of humidity and time, with several sections visibly affected. These include El señor de los tlaxcaltecas, Ritual en honor al Dios Camaxtli, Sacrificio gladiatorio, del general Tlahuicole en Tenochtitlan and Deidad Tlaxcalteca, with the most severe damage at the main entrance to the building.

== Other work ==
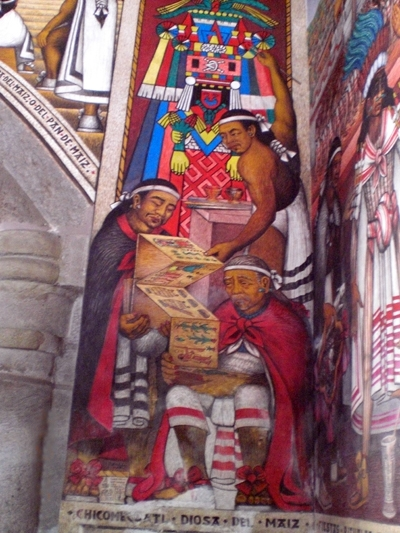
Self-portrait of Desiderio Hernández Pintando, the Goddess of Corn, seeing an old Codex, his Grandfather is sitting next to his father who is standing.

Hernández Xochitiotzin's life's work including various drawing and engravings, especially in his early career. He was also a writer, architect, chronicler, teacher, researcher and art restoration expert. He had his first important individual exhibition in 1947 while still in school. Before 1957, he had expositions in Mexico, the Vatican, Harvard University, Sorbonne University and the Stockholm University. He illustrated books such as a catalog of the works of Ernesto de la Torre in 1999 and Pintura mural de México la época prehispánica, el virreinato y los grandes artistas de nuestro siglo by Rafael Carrillo Azpéitia.

In addition to the mural at the State Government Palace, he also painted an important one at the municipal palace in Huamantla, Tlaxcala in 1968. Others include a fresco in Tehuacán, Puebla and a mural of the history of Reynosa, Tamaulipas in that city.

The research he did to prepare murals led him to become an expert on the history and culture of Tlaxcala, becoming a teacher and speaker at conferences. He was the official historian of the city of Tlaxcala, investigating the history of the architecture of city in preparation for their naming as historic monuments in the 1970s and 1980s.

Although without formal training, he did work as an architect. Projects including the remodeling of the Ocotlan Basilica, and the remodeling of the atriums of churches in Zacatelco and Texoloc as well as designing the chapel at the Tlaxcala Seminary. He co-designed a building located in the historic center of Puebla located across from the Puebla Cathedral. He also worked on numerous restorations and remodeling of various historic buildings in Tlaxcala and Puebla. He founded the architecture school at Benemérita Universidad Autónoma de Puebla and was a professor there until 1968.

Other notable work includes the design of the municipal seal of Xaloztoc in 1973 for the municipality's centennial, and was a founding member of the Salón de la Plástica Mexicana. Harvard and the University of Oklahoma named him as the best Mexican muralist of the 20th century. He was given an honorary degree in architecture by Universidad Popular Autónoma del Estado de Puebla.

== Artistry ==
He was part of the second generation of Mexican muralism movement and the last to use the fresco technique extensively. Influences include José Guadalupe Posada, Agustín Arrieta, Francisco Goitia as well as Mexican muralists José Clemente Orozco, David Alfaro Siqueiros and especially Diego Rivera. Recurrent themes in his work include history, landscapes, festivals, local customs, religion and rural life. His most important work has themes related to the state of Tlaxcala and its history. His work tends to contain strong colors and realistic figures.

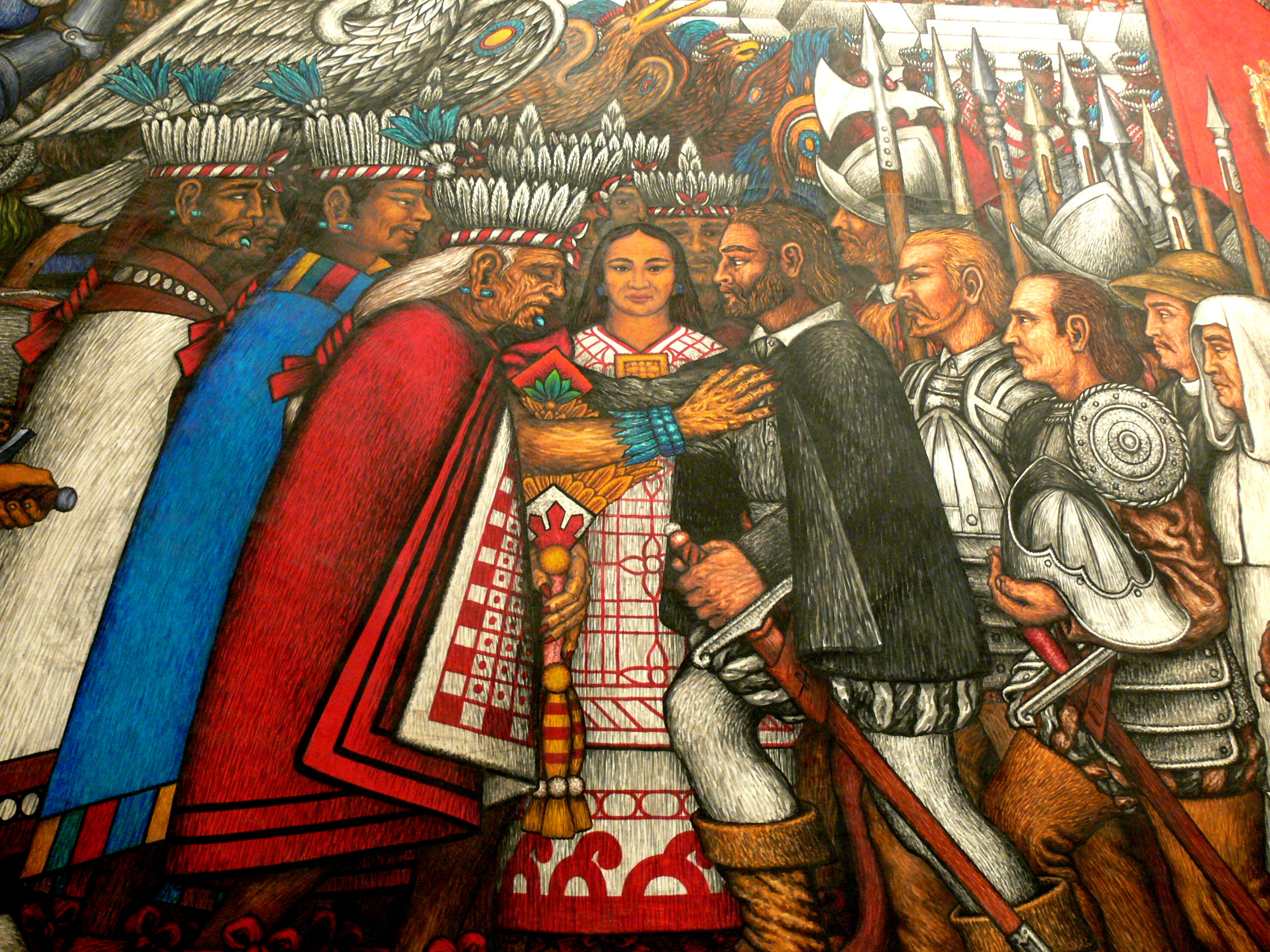
Discussions between Tlaxcaltecs and Hernán Cortés.

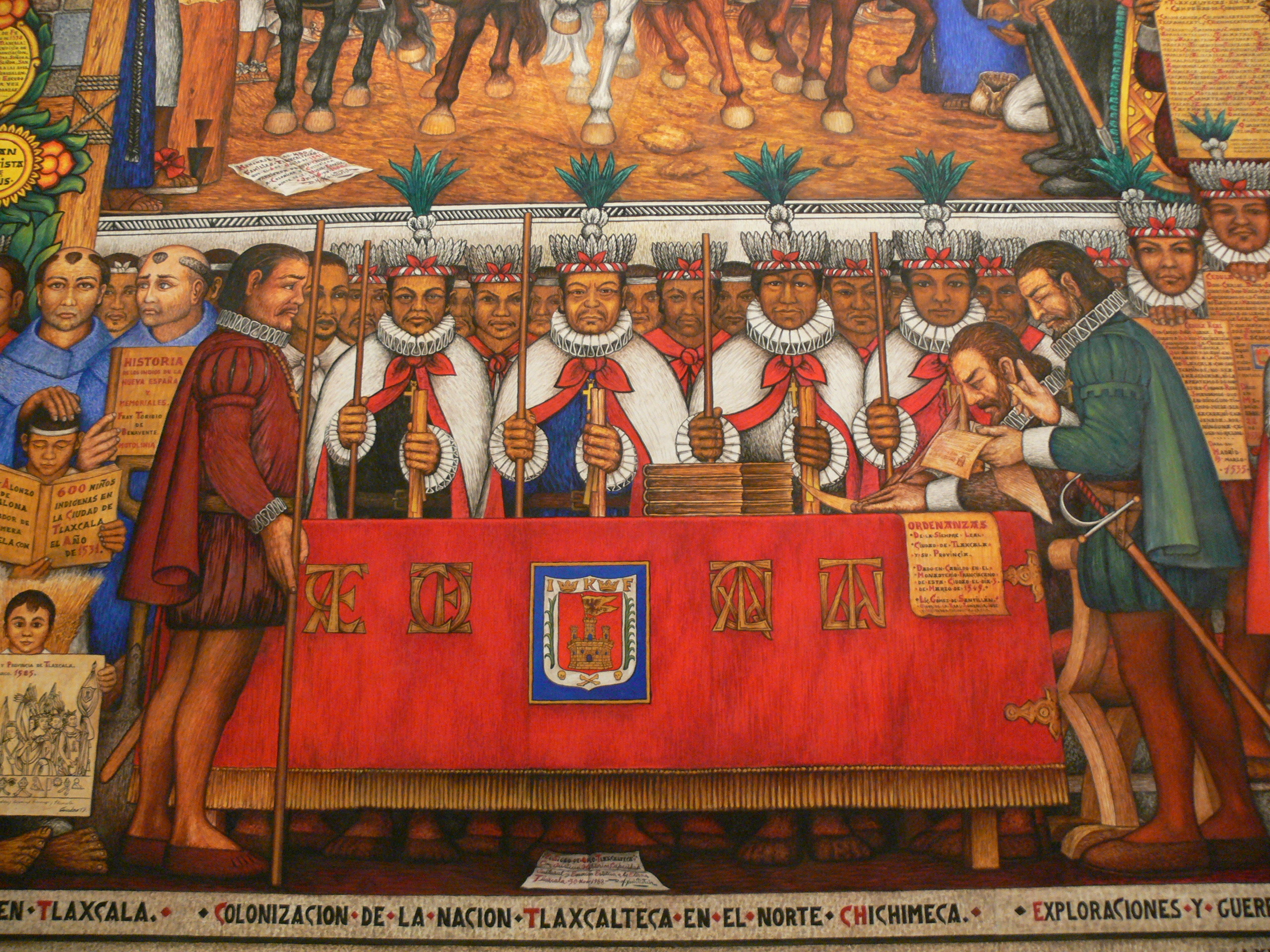
Tlaxcaltec gets a Spanish province (1545)

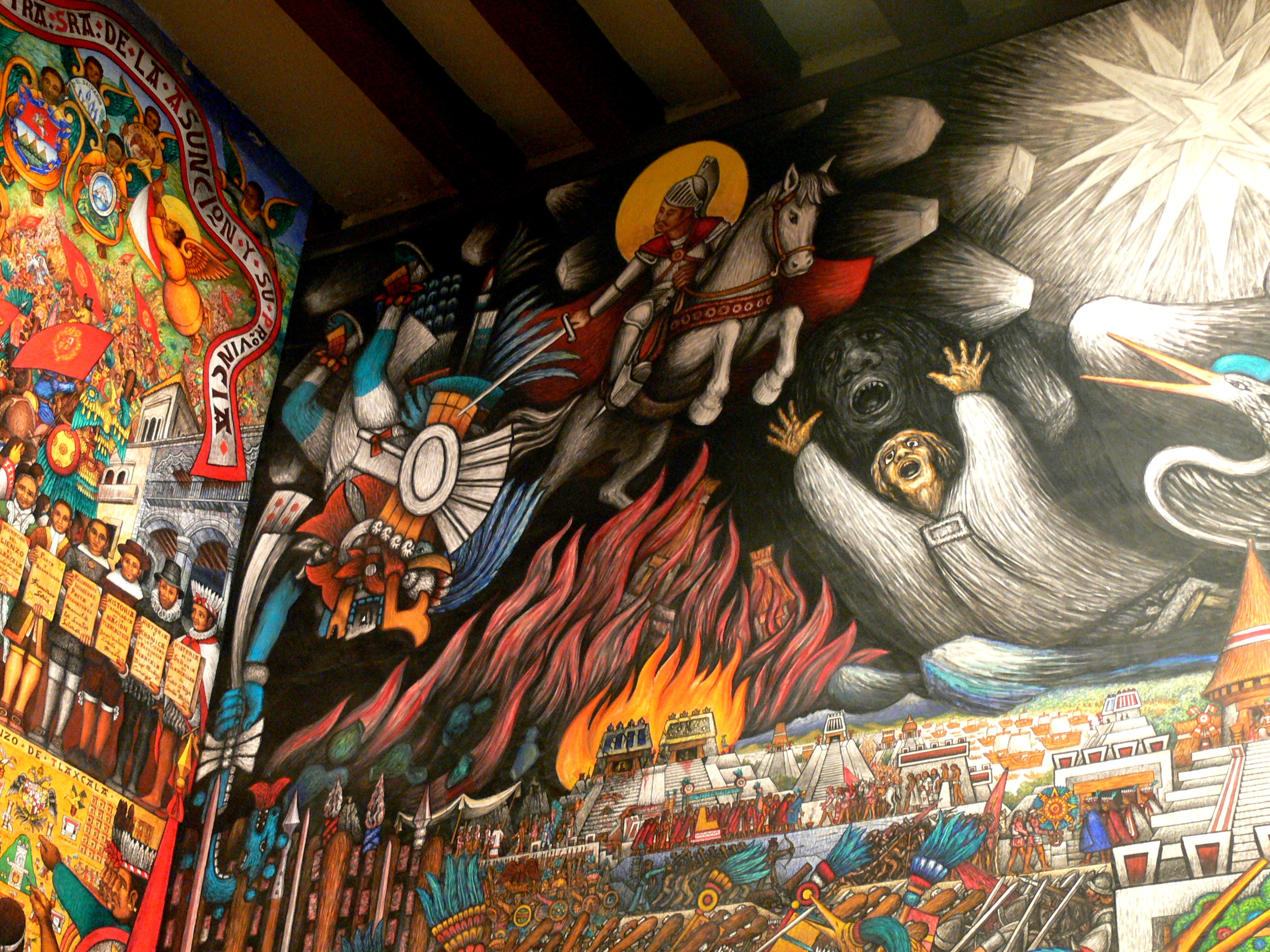
Destruction of the indian gods by the Spanish conquest.

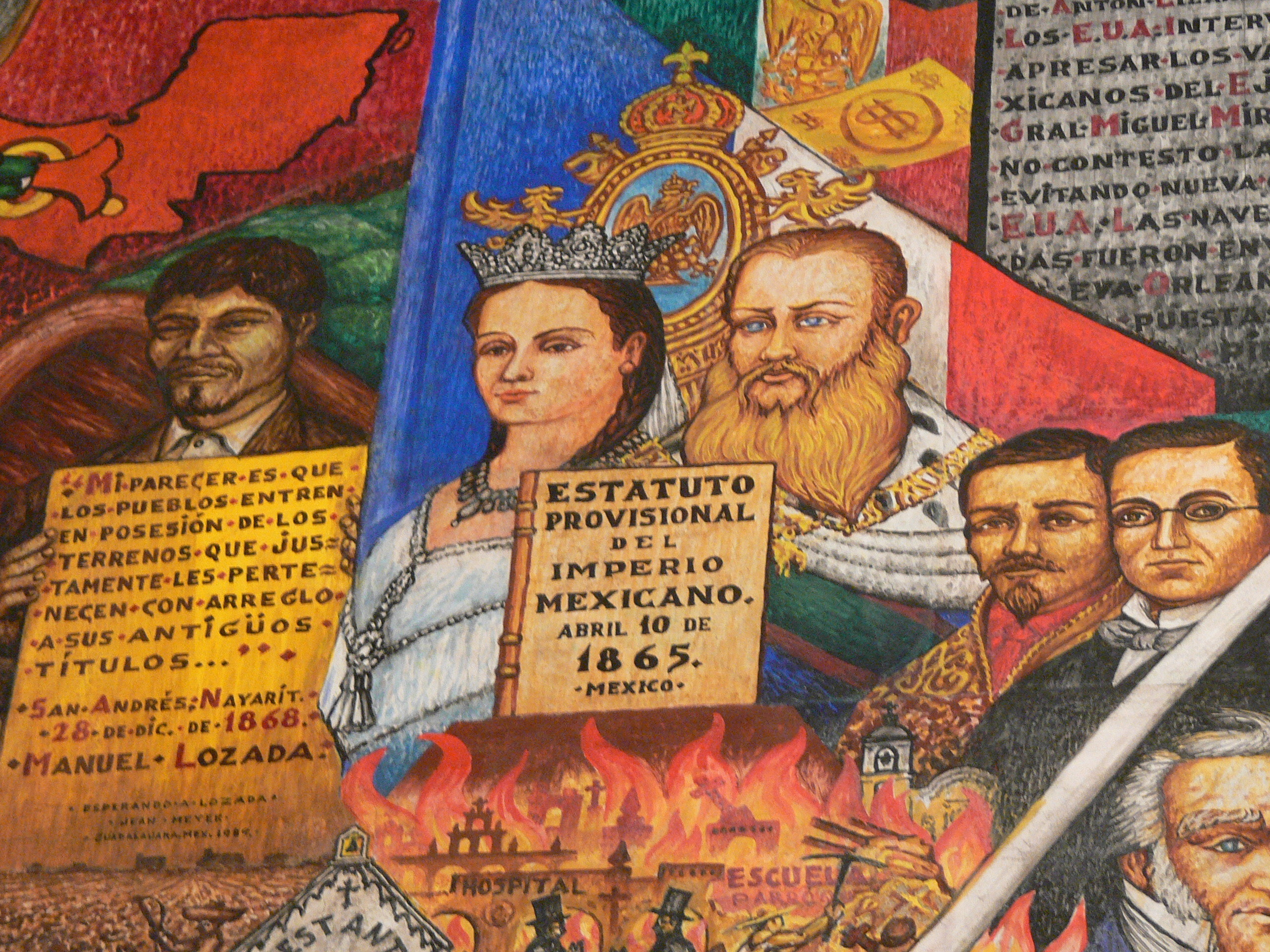
Maximiliano I of Mexico and Carlota of Mexico

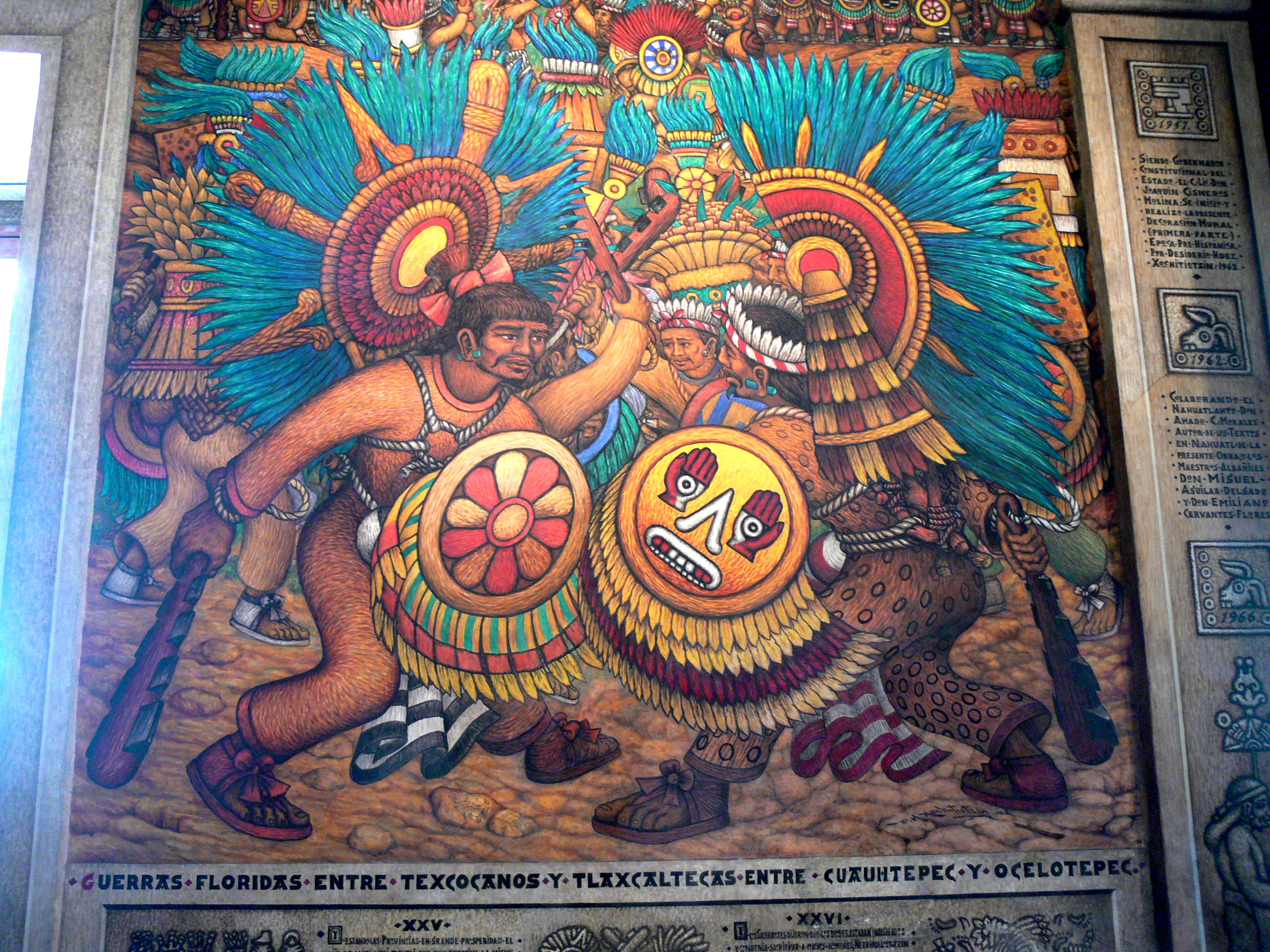
Flower Wars Tlaxcaltecan warriors fighting against warrior from Texcoco, Cuauhtepec and Ocelotepec.

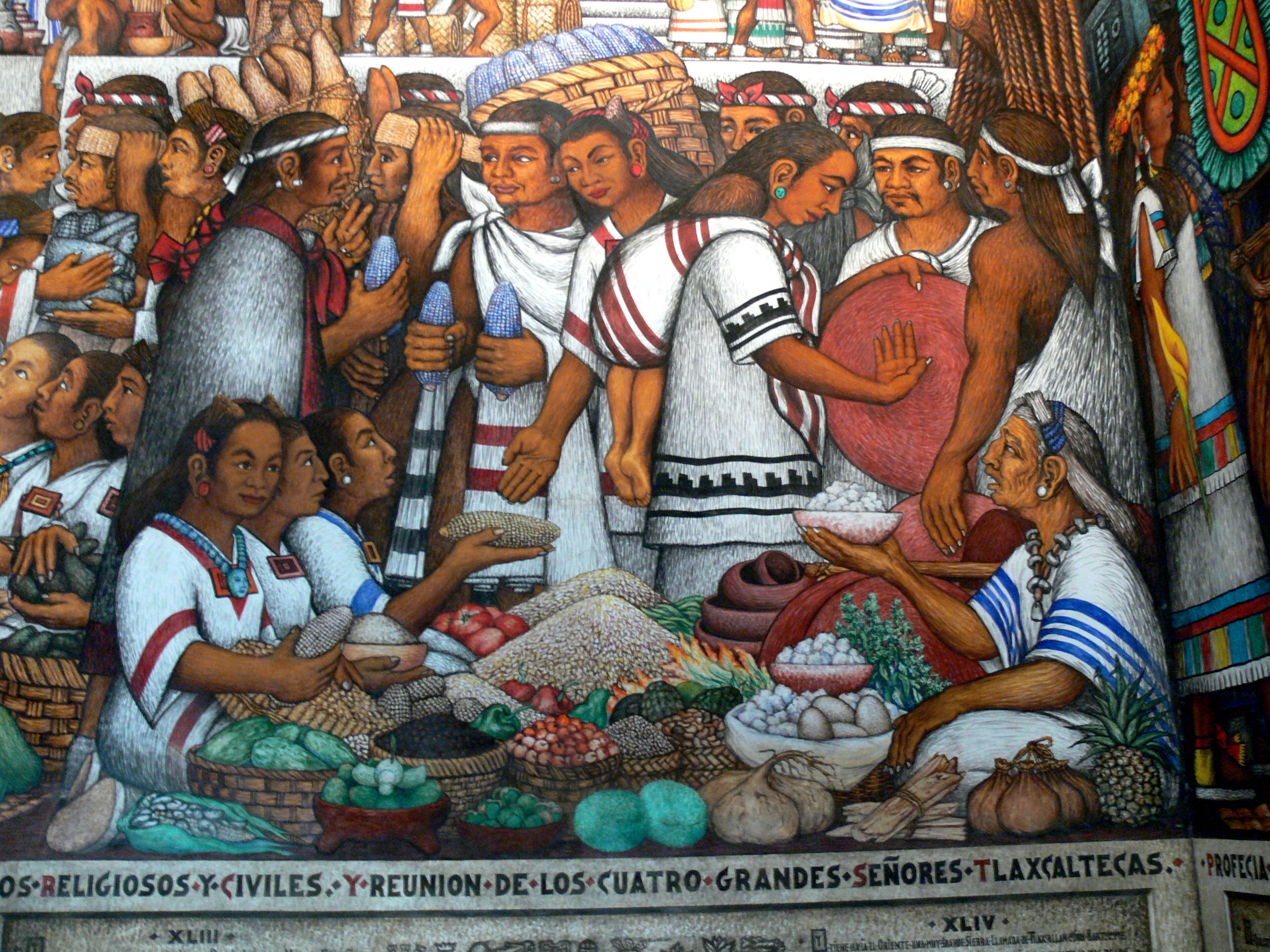
Aboriginal merchants in the Tlaxcala market

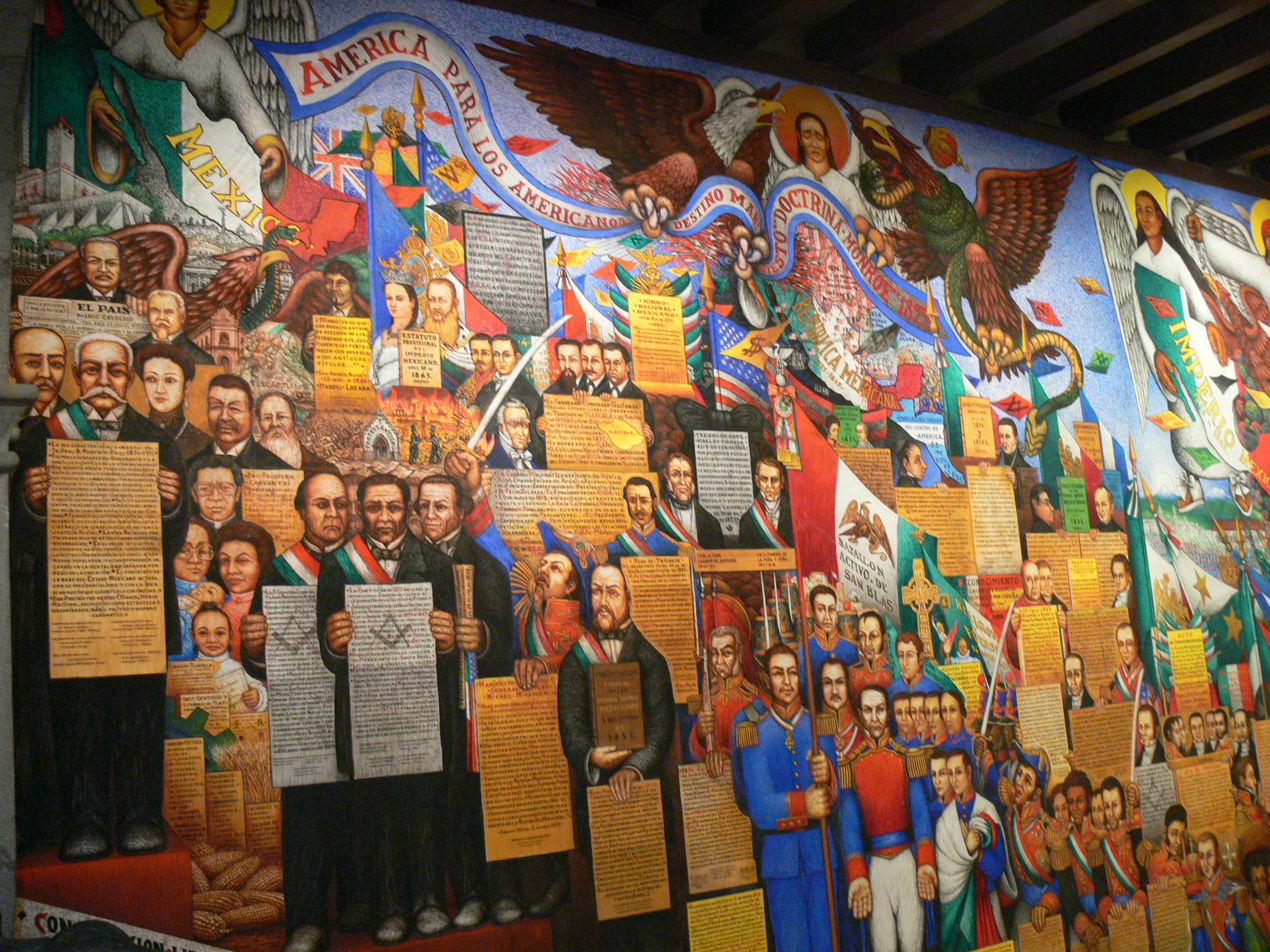
History of Mexico since its Independence
