= Huamantla Municipality =

Coordinates: 19.3185°N 97.9234°W

Huamantla
- Municipality
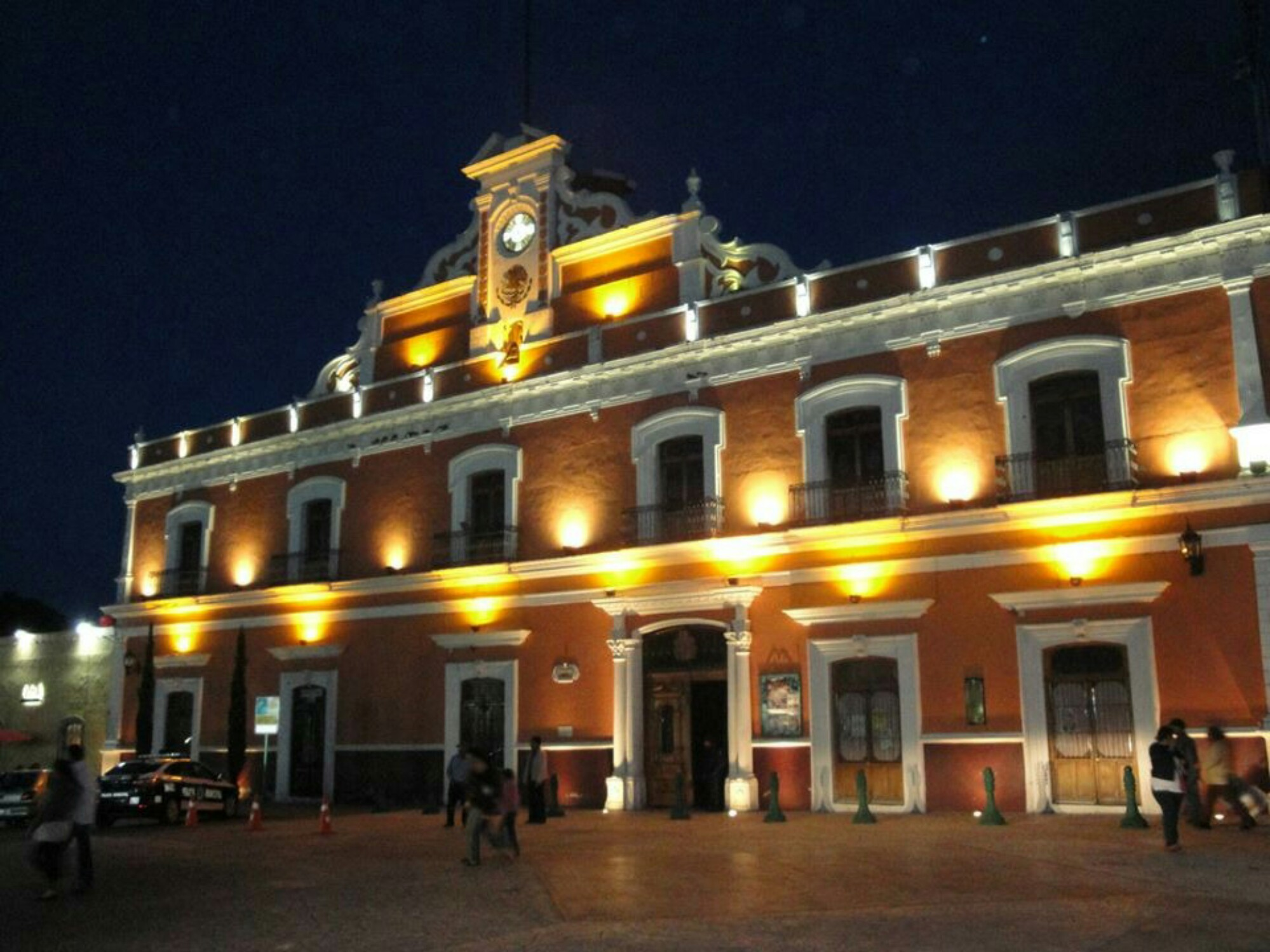
- Municipal Palace

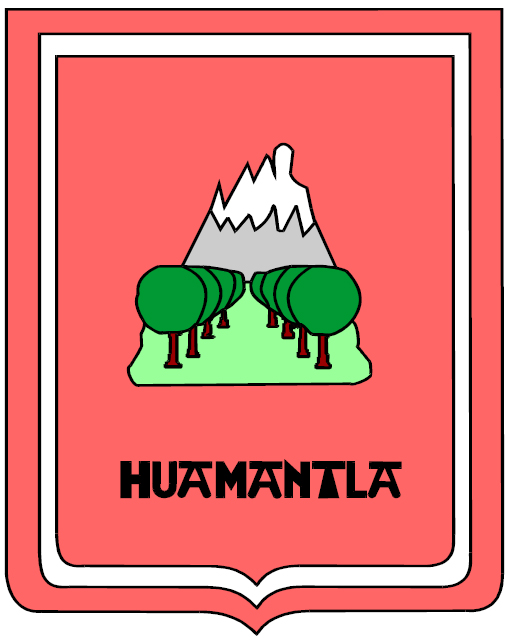
- Coat of arms

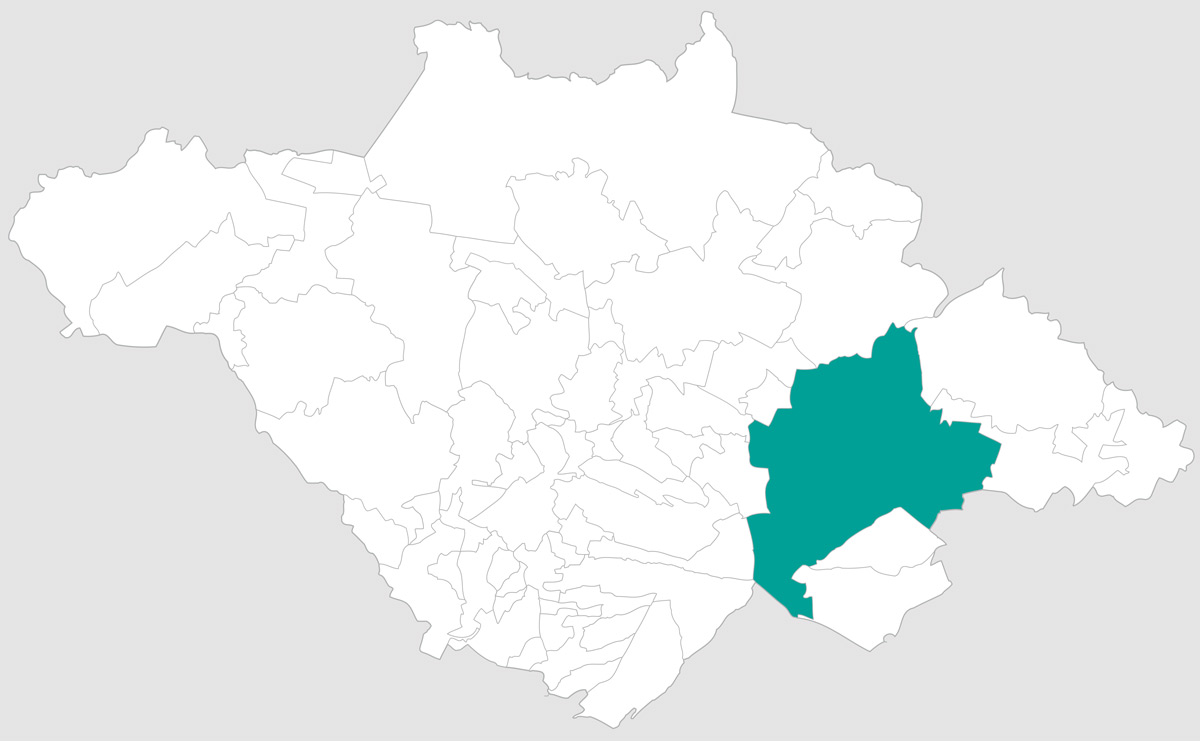
- Location of the municipality in Tlaxcala.
- Country: Mexico
- State: Tlaxcala
- Municipal seat: Huamantla
- Time zone: UTC-6 (Central Standard Time)
- Website: https://www.huamantla.gob.mx/

Huamantla is a municipality in the Mexican state of Tlaxcala in central Mexico. The city of Huamantla serves as its municipal seat.
