= Battle of Chihuahua =

Coordinates: 28°38′N 106°04′W

- Part of the Second French intervention in Mexico
Date	March 25, 1866
Location	Chihuahua, Chihuahua, Mexico
Result	Mexican Republican victory: Imperialist Forces are Completely Defeated

Belligerents
(Mexico) Mexican Republicans	(France) French Empire (Mexico) Mexican Empire

Commanders and leaders
(Mexico) Luis Terrazas (Mexico) Sostenes Rocha (Mexico) Ignacio Mejia (Mexico) Joaquin Terrazas	(France) Col. Billot (surrendered) (Mexico) Juan Ramirez (surrendered) (Mexico) Julio Carranco (surrendered) (Mexico) Col. Feliciano Enriquez (surrendered) (Mexico) José de la Luz Miramontes (surrendered)

Strength
700 – 1,000	700 Imperialists and 600 French Reinforcements

Casualties and losses
7 killed	26 killed and 300 prisoners

The Battle of Chihuahua or Recapture of Chihuahua took place on March 25, 1866, in the city of Chihuahua, capital of the Mexican state of Chihuahua, between elements of the Mexican Army of the Republic, led by Colonel Luis Terrazas, and French and Mexican troops in the service of the Second Mexican Empire during the Second French intervention in Mexico. The attack on Chihuahua was launched by the Republicans at 8 am against the imperial occupying forces, resulting in an imperial surrender of the city two hours later.
