= KMRC (AM) =

- Morgan City, Louisiana; United States
- Frequency: 1430 kHz
- Branding: The Swamp Dawg

Programming
- Format: Swamp pop

Ownership
- Owner: Spotlight Broadcasting of New Orleans, LLC

History
- First air date: June 11, 1954

Technical information
- Licensing authority: FCC
- Facility ID: 67681
- Class: D
- Power: 500 watts day
- Transmitter coordinates: 29°45′3.4416″N 91°10′25.4280″W
- Translator: 92.9 K225CP (Morgan City)

Links
- Public license information: Public file; LMS
- Webcast: Listen Live
- Website: kmrcradio.com

KMRC (1430 kHz) is an AM radio station airing a swamp pop format, licensed to Morgan City, Louisiana. KMRC is one of the few stations currently programming swamp pop. The station broadcasts during daytime hours only, and is owned by Spotlight Broadcasting of New Orleans, LLC.

Logo before translator sign on
