= WMNC (AM) =

- Morganton, North Carolina; United States
- Frequency: 1430 kHz

Programming
- Format: Classic Country
- Affiliations: CNN Radio, Jones Radio Network

Ownership
- Owner: Cooper Broadcasting Company

History
- Call sign meaning: W Morganton, North Carolina

Technical information
- Licensing authority: FCC
- Facility ID: 13833
- Class: D
- Power: 2,700 watts day 46 watts night
- Transmitter coordinates: 35°45′9.00″N 81°43′19.00″W
- Translator: (106.3 MHz) W292FL (Morganton)

Links
- Public license information: Public file; LMS
- Website: Big Dawg 92.1 Website

WMNC (1430 AM) is a radio station licensed to Morganton, North Carolina, United States. The station signed-on in 1947 and is currently owned by Cooper Broadcasting Company.
