= XHHT-FM =

Radio station in Huamantla, Tlaxcala

Huamantla/Ignacio Zaragoza, Tlaxcala; Mexico
- Frequency: 106.9 FM
- Branding: Radio Huamantla

Programming
- Format: Mexican

Ownership
- Owner: Radio Huamantla, S.A. de C.V.

History
- First air date: 1948
- Call sign meaning: Huamantla Tlaxcala

Technical information
- ERP: 3,000 watts
- Transmitter coordinates: 19°17′09″N 97°54′53″W

Links
- Webcast: Listen live
- Website: radiohuamantla.net

XHHT-FM is a radio station in Huamantla, Tlaxcala. Broadcasting on 106.9 FM, XHHT is known as Radio Huamantla and carries a full-service format.

== History ==
XEHT-AM was the first radio station in Tlaxcala, signing on in 1948 on 1520 kHz. It would later move to 810 and increase its power to 5,000 watts before migrating to FM as XHHT-FM 106.9.
