= Calpulalpan Municipality =

Calpulalpan
- Municipality
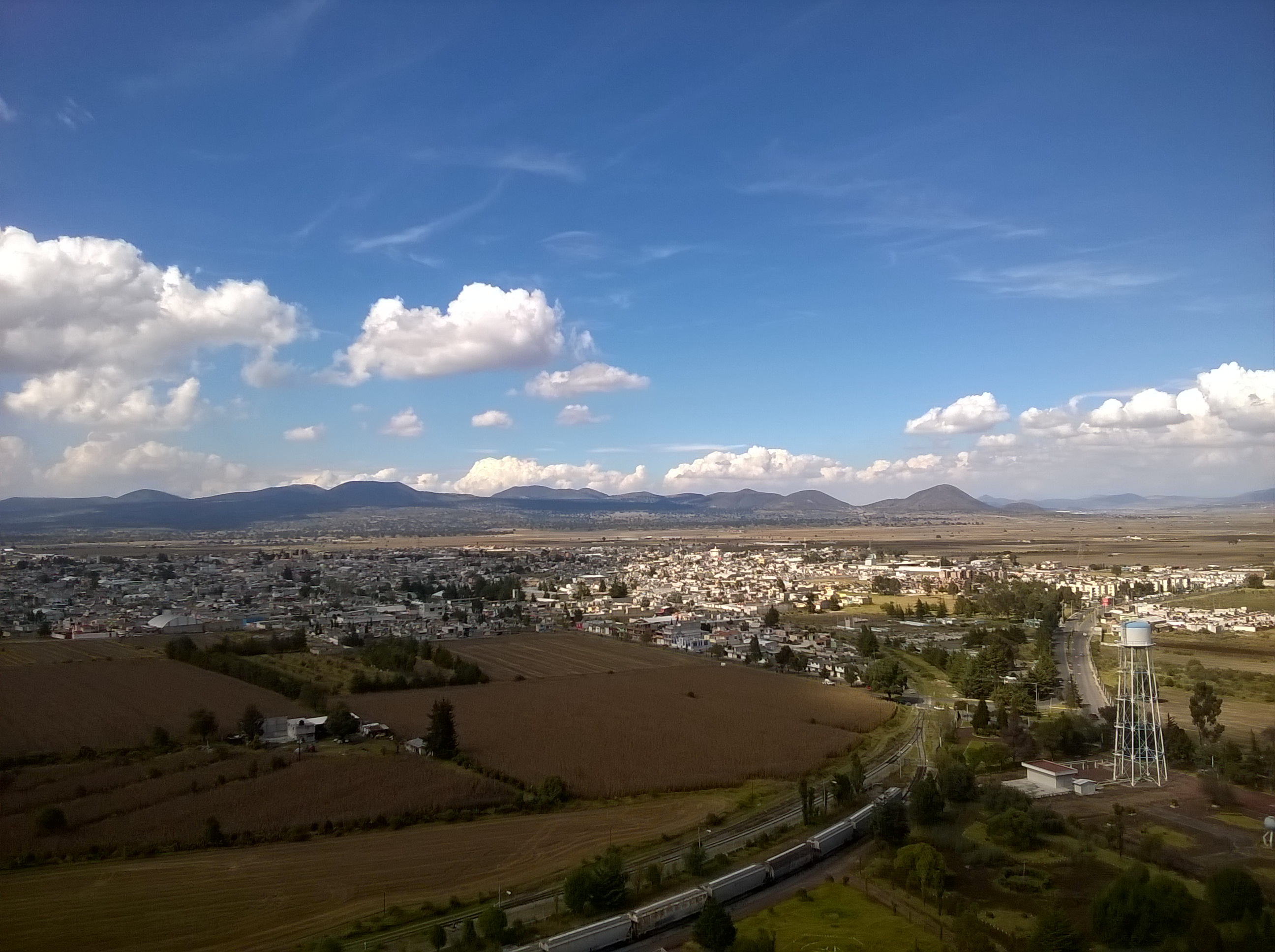
- Aerial view of Calpulalpan, Tlaxcala

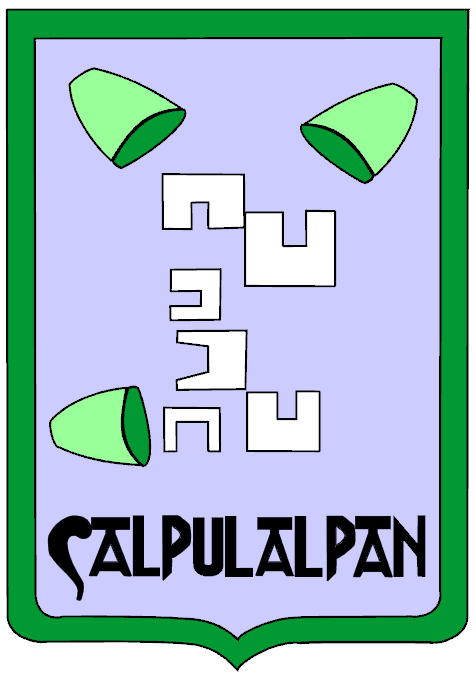
- Coat of arms

- Location within Tlaxcala Location within Mexico
- Coordinates: 19.5833°N 98.5667°W
- Country: Mexico
- State: Tlaxcala
- Municipal seat: Calpulalpan
- Time zone: UTC-6 (Central)

Calpulalpan is a municipality in the Mexican state of Tlaxcala. The area of the municipality is 254.82 km^{2} (98.39 sq mi).

The municipal seat is at Calpulalpan.

It is bordered to the north by the State of Hidalgo, to the south by Nanacamilpa, to the east by Lázaro Cárdenas, and to the west by the State of Mexico. It belongs to the III Federal Electoral District of Tlaxcala.

== Notable sites ==
The municipality has various aspects of tourist interest; among them:

- Parish of San Antonio de Padua.
- Convent of San Simon.
- Convent of San Francisco; dates from the 16th century.
- The Chapel of the Third Order.
- The archaeological ruins of classical times: los cerritos, tecoaque and la herradura.
- La barranca del Diablo.
- Feria de Calpulalpan: This festival is celebrated annually for fifteen days, the main day being June 13. This festival, also known as the pulque and barbecue fair, is celebrated religiously in honor of San Antonio de Padua; there is a great variety of ethnic groups from neighboring municipalities and even from the States of Hidalgo and Mexico that every year make a pilgrimage to the Parish of San Antonio de Padua and give thanks for the miracles granted.
- The ExHacienda of San Bartolomé del Monte.
