= Calpulalpan =

City in the Mexican state of Tlaxcala

- City
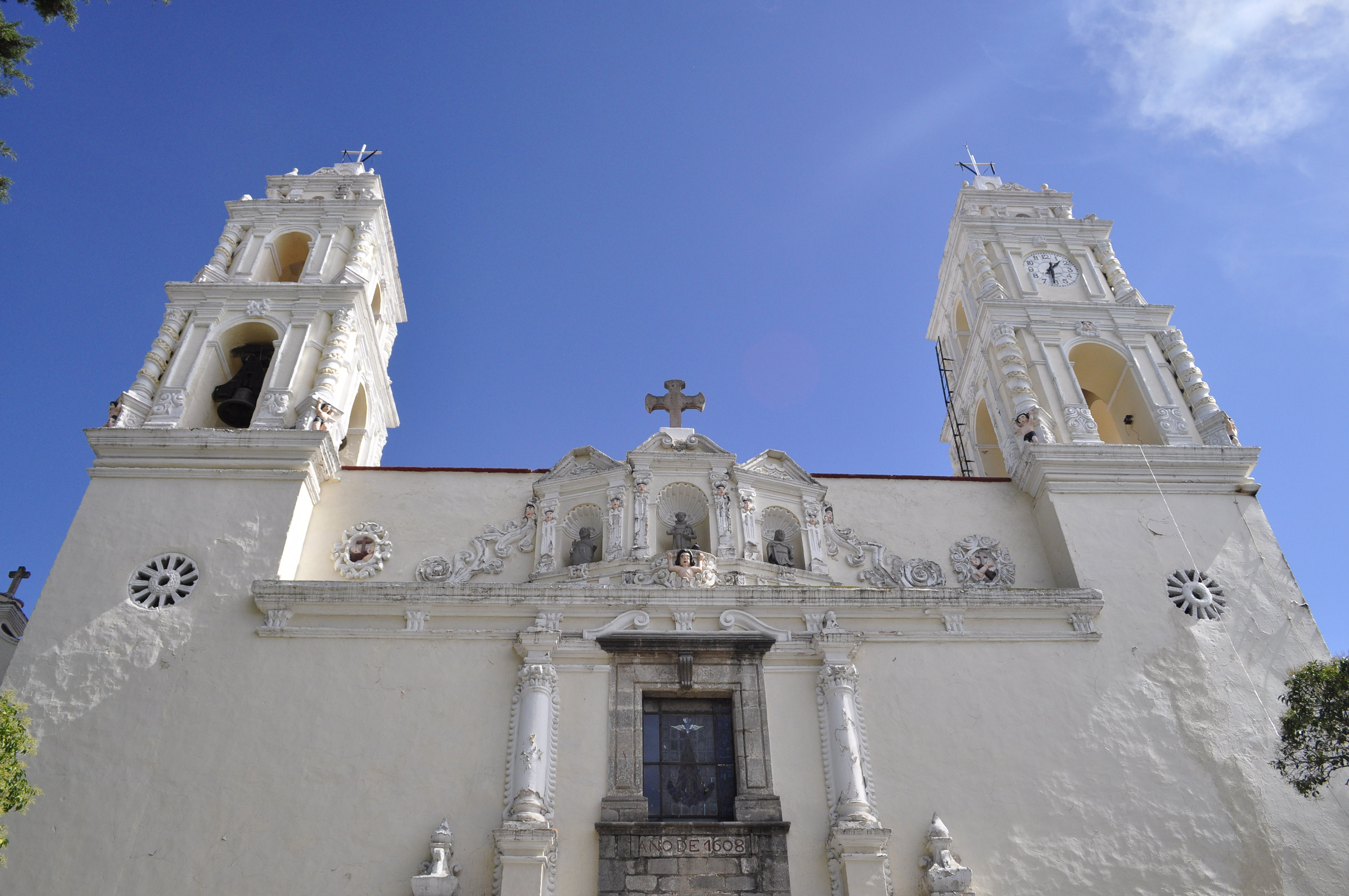
- Parish of San Antonio de Padua

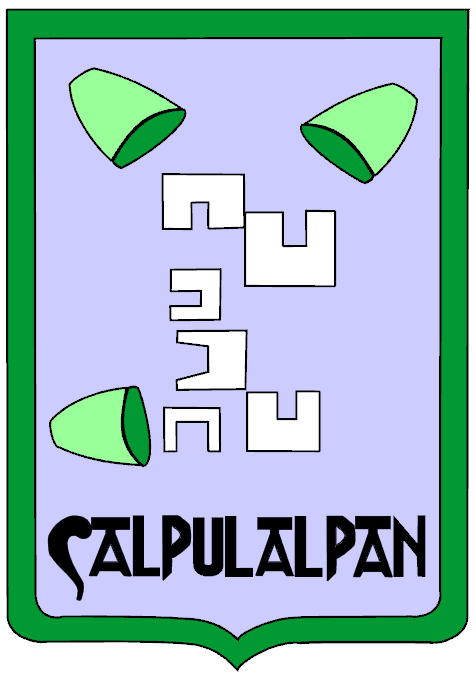
- Seal
- Nicknames: Spanish: La puerta grande de Tlaxcala (transl. The big door of Tlaxcala)
- Location within Tlaxcala Location within Mexico
- Coordinates: 19°35′13″N 98°34′06″W
- Country: Mexico
- State: Tlaxcala
- Municipality: Calpulalpan
- Foundation: 1608

Government
  - Mayor: Neptalí Gutiérrez

Area
  - Total: 9.98 km^{2} (3.85 sq mi)
- Elevation: 2,591 m (8,501 ft)

Population (2010)
  - Total: 33,263
  - Estimate (2015): 37,752
  - Demonym: Calpulalpense
- Time zone: UTC-6 (Zona Centro)
- Area code: 749

Calpulalpan, officially the Heroic City of Calpulalpan, is a Mexican city, head and main urban center of the homonymous municipality, located to the west of the state of Tlaxcala. With 33,263 inhabitants in 2010 according to the population and housing census conducted by the National Institute of Statistics and Geography (INEGI), it is the sixth most populous city in the state. It has an estimated population of 37,752 inhabitants for 2017, according to the National Population Council (CONAPO).

The Heroic City designation was conferred in 2015 in recognition of the action on 10 April 1867 during the Second French Intervention in which, according to municipal authorities, Republican forces under General Porfirio Díaz defeated a contingent of Imperialists under General Leonardo Márquez. The engagement is sometimes identified as the Battle of Puente de Márquez.

== Sister cities ==
- (Mexico) Pahuatlán, Puebla
