= Huamantla =

- Municipal seat
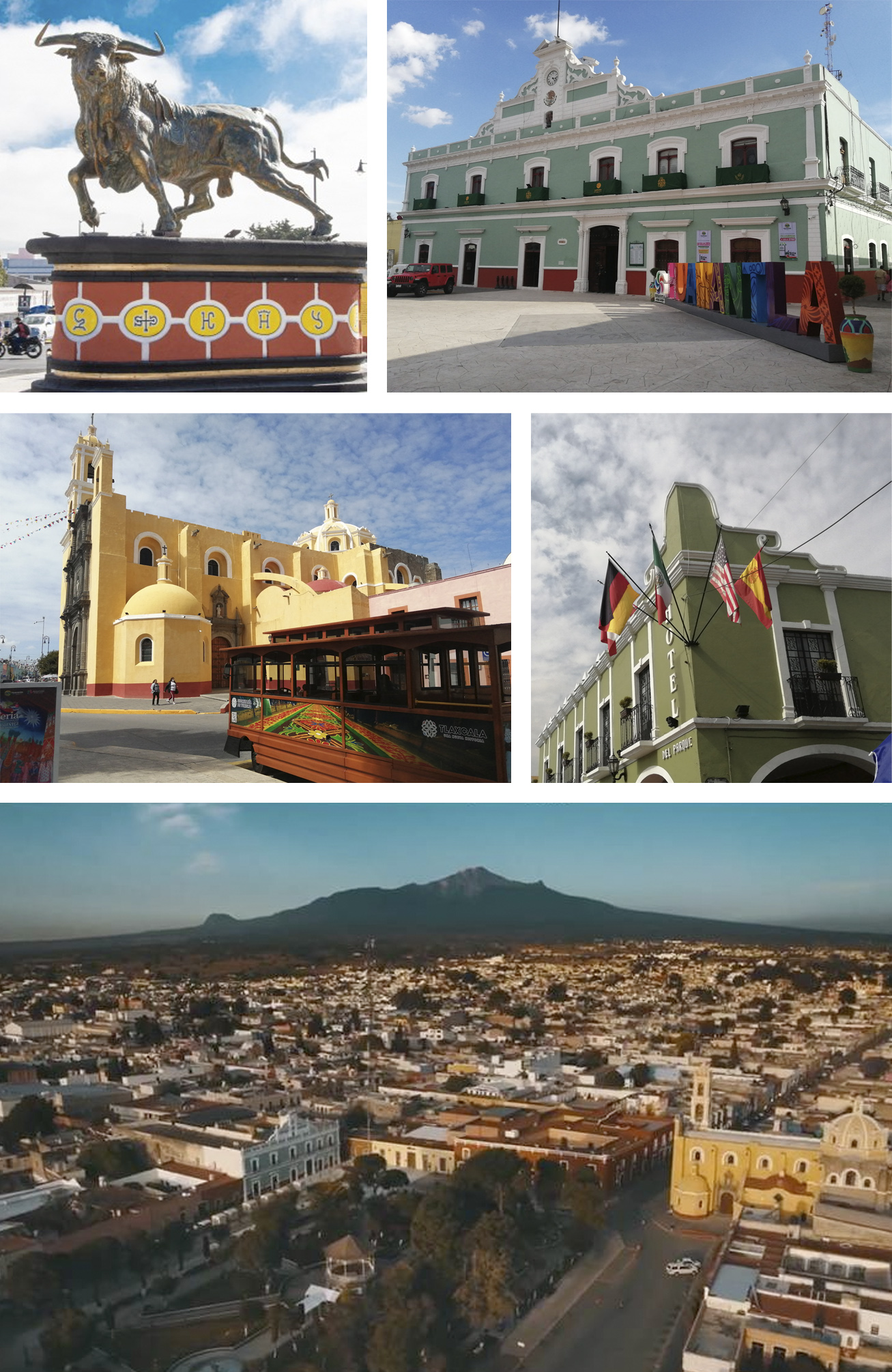
- Landmarks and buildings throughout Huamantla

- Location within Tlaxcala Location within Mexico
- Coordinates: 19°18′48″N 97°55′22″W
- Country: Mexico
- State: Tlaxcala

Government
  - Municipal president: Juan Salvador Santos Cedillo

Population (2020)
  - Total: 59,871
- Time zone: UTC-6 (Central Time)
- Website: Municipal website

Huamantla (Spanish: [waˈmantla]) is a small city in the municipality of the same name in the eastern half of the Mexican state of Tlaxcala. The area has a long indigenous history, but the city itself was not founded until the early colonial period, in the 1530s. It is mostly agricultural but it is best known for its annual homage to an image of the Virgin Mary called Our Lady of Charity. This includes a month of festivities, the best known of which are the "night no one sleeps" when residents create six km of "carpets" on the streets made from colored sawdust, flowers and other materials. The other is the "Huamantlada" a running of the bulls similar to that in Pamplona.

== Etymology ==
The name comes from various Nahuatl words (cuahuitl (tree), man (next or in line) and tla (abundance)), which together are interpreted as place of aligned trees.

== The town ==
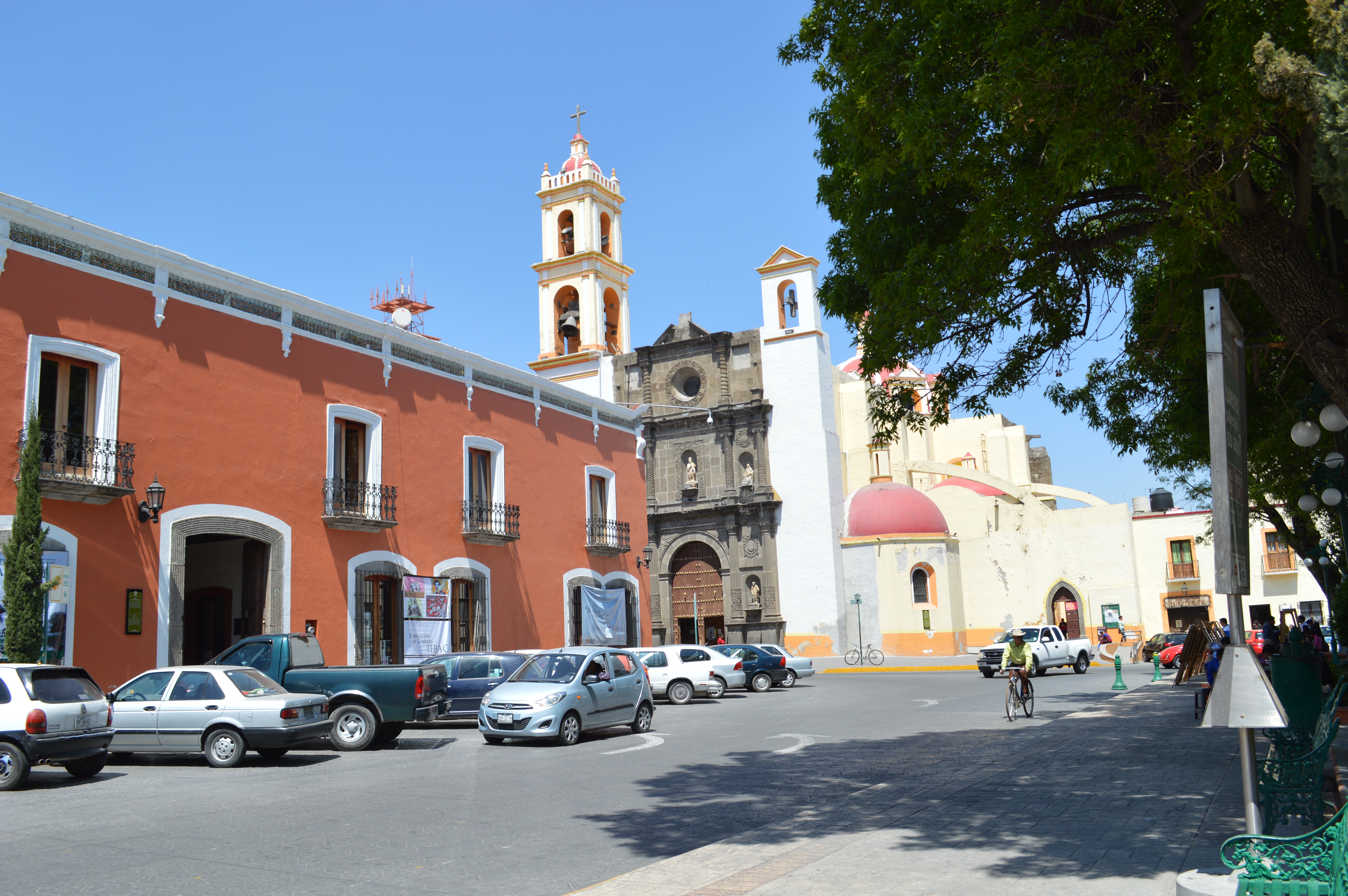
View of the San Luis Parish and the cultural center from Parque Juárez

The city of Huamantla is in the east of the state of Tlaxcala, about 45 km from the state capital. The main entrance to the city is marked by the Monumento al Toro (Bull Monument), a bronze sculpture by architect Diódoro Rodríguez Anaya. It is dedicated to the regions' bull raising and fighting tradition.

The city is centered on its main plaza, called Parque Juárez (Juarez Park), which contains gardens and a kiosk from the beginning of the 20th century. The blocks around it conserve many historic buildings from the colonial period up through the Porfirio Diáz era, with simple facades and iron-railed balconies. For this reason and the celebrations related to Our Lady of Charity in August, the city has been named a “Pueblo Mágico.”

The main colonial era constructions are the parish of San Luis Obispo and the former monastery of the same name, both of which were begun in the 16th century and named after Huamantla's patron saint, Louis of Toulouse. The monastery complex was built between 1567 and 1585 and has a number of elements, focused on a main church with a simple facade. Above the door there is a niche containing an image of Saint Anthony and on either side of this, there are the coats of arms of the order. The bell tower has two levels and Solomonic columns. Inside the church, there is a chapel dedicated to a Christ figure called the Señor del Desposo. The main altar of this church is Churrigueresque with Neoclassical altars on the sides. To the side, there is a large open chapel with five arches supported by Tuscan columns with Doric capitals. The cloister area has been remodeled various times but original elements such as Tuscan columns remain. The Third Order chapel contains the complexes oldest oil paintings and a Baroque main altar.

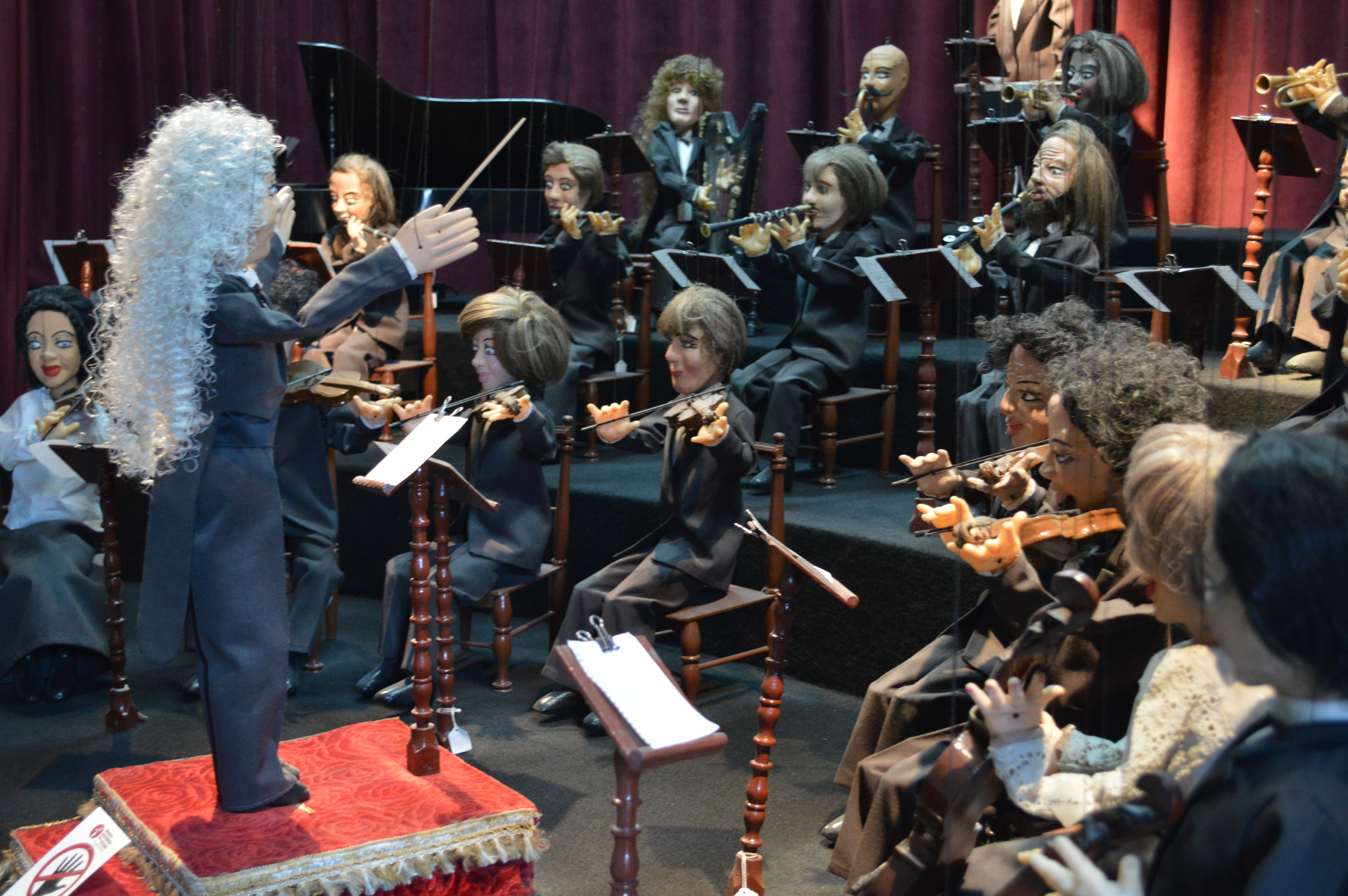
Puppet orchestra on display at the National Puppet Museum

The San Luis Obispo Parish church is built of light stone, with a contrasting dark grey main portal. In this portal there are six niches filled with the same number of statues made from alabaster. It has a single bell tower and a small bell-gable. Inside, the main altar is Baroque with an image of Louise of Toulouse. There is also Salomonic altar dedicated to the Virgin Mary and one to Jesus the Nazarene and oil paintings from the colonial period, including one of the Virgin of Guadalupe by Miguel Cabrera. Also facing the park is the municipal palace, it is in Neoclassical style with two floors, both with balconies, framed by cornices, a style common to Huamantla. It has a simple main entrance above which are a decorative element including the Mexican coat of arms, a clock and a small bell. Inside, there is a mural by Desiderio Hernández Xochitiotzin, a reproduction of the Huamantla Codex and a photographic collection.

Modern Mexican puppetry is traced to Huamantla, especially to the Rosete Aranda family which began their traveling puppet show in 1850, which lasted over a century. Today, the city is home to the Rosete Aranda National Puppet Museum, the only one of its kind in Latin America, located in a former mansion facing the main square. It contains eight main halls containing puppets, sets and other paraphernalia from this family, other puppeteers from Mexico and puppets from other countries such as Germany, Spain, France, Italy, India and Indonesia. It also has a collection of pre Hispanic dolls/puppets with movable parts, including some from nearby Cacaxtla.

The Huamantla Cultural Center is located next to the puppet museum, occupying the former priest's residence constructed between the 18th and 19th centuries. It has eight halls dedicated to various temporary exhibits and workshops.

The Museo Taurino (Bullfighting Museum) is located in a building from the 18th century, next the city's bullring. The museum opened in 1981 after remodeling and today it hosts a collection of event posters from the 20th century, models of various bullrings in Mexico, matador outfits and photographs.

== Feria de Huamantla ==
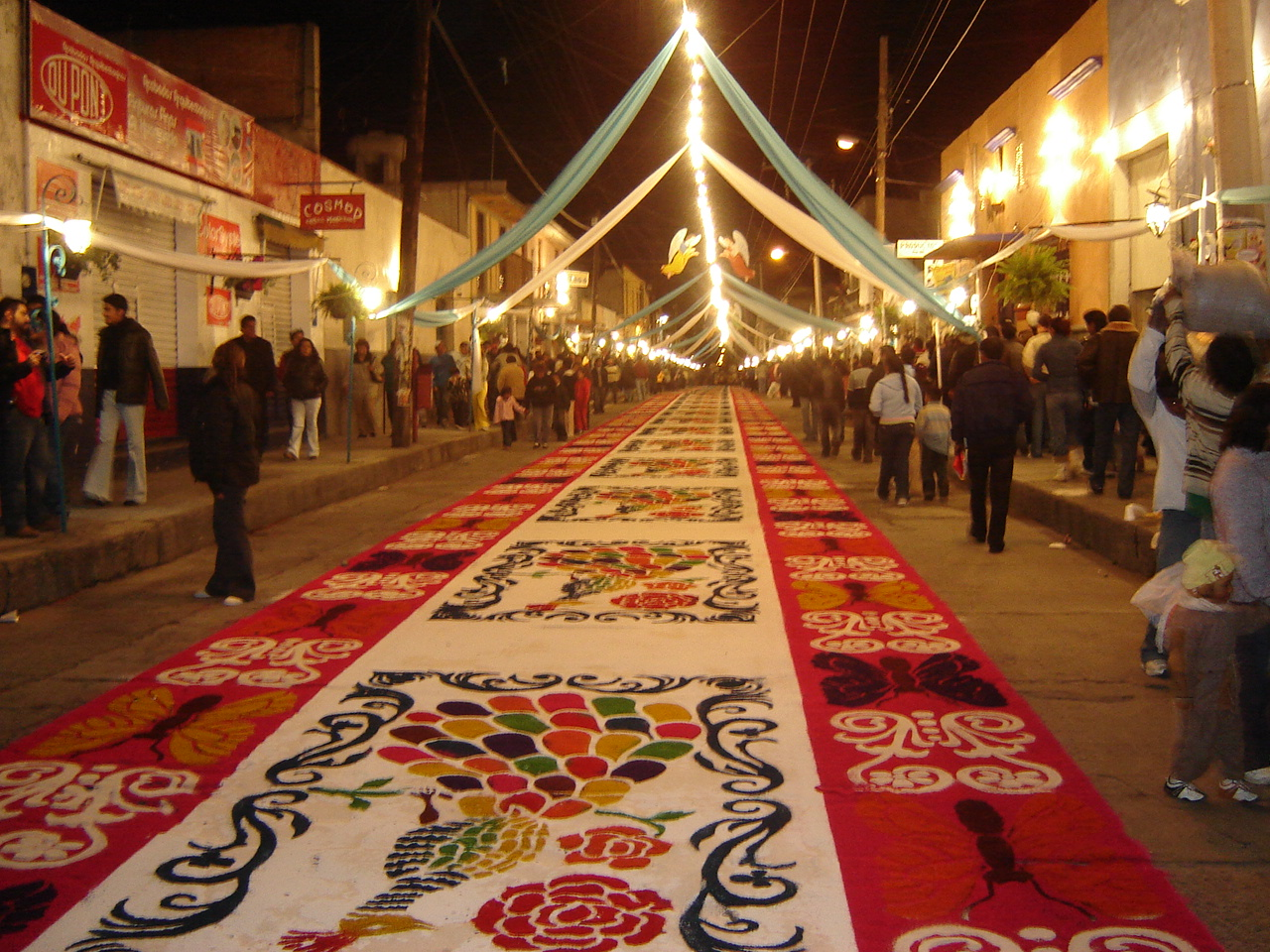
Section of a carpet laid out on the streets of the city

The main cultural event of the year in Huamantla is the Feria de Huamantla (Huamantla Fair) which runs from 31 July to 21 August. Its origin is likely due to the worship of the goddess Xochiquetzal, goddess of love, flowers and arts. After the Conquest, the Spanish encouraged the veneration of the Virgin Mary instead. In the 17th century, the Franciscans built a hermitage to Our Lady of the Assumption. The image found here today has unknown origins but has since become associated with miracles. The feria attracts thousands of visitors from both Mexico and abroad.

This image is better known as Our Lady of Charity (Virgen de la Caridad). There are two main events during the months, creation of "carpets" from colored sawdust, flowers and other materials and a running of the bulls called the Huamantlada. The carpets are made constantly in the atrium of this image's basilica and other churches from the 31 to the 15; however, 6 km of carpets are created on "the night no one sleeps," that of August 14, working all night in preparation for the main procession with the image on August 15. Before the procession begins, the image is dressed in new robes and the image is followed by an entourage with candles and fireworks.

The Huamantlada is held on August 19. The first event occurred in 1954 and has since grown in popularity. It is based on the running of the bulls in Pamplona and was originally called the "Pamplonada". The first run had seven bulls which has since grown in number to about twenty five. The running of the bulls is more dangerous as the animals are released into the streets from two directions. This event is the most famous of its kind in Mexico.

During the month there are also donkey and car races, a children's version of running with the bulls, a parade with floats, a feria queen, a paella festival, cockfights, a chess tournament and the Festival International de Títeres Rosete Aranda.

During this month and other traditional festivals one can see traditional dances such as Ketzalines, Vaqueros, Vasarios and Matlachines danced to bands playing wind instruments, and traditional dress, which is of Otomi origin. For men, it consists of white pants and a shirt, which is embroidered with figures and fretwork. For women it consists of a heavily embroidered colorful skirt, embroidered blouse and rebozo. Typical foods include mixiotes, barbacoa, mole with turkey, Tocatlán style chicken along with crystallized fruit and a dessert item called "muégano."

== The municipality ==
The city of Huamantla is the local governing authorities for surrounding communities, creating a municipality with a territory of 340.33 km^{2}. This entity borders municipalities of Terrenate, Altzayanca, Ixtenco, Cuapiaxtla, Xaloztoc, San José Teacalco, Tetlanohcan, Tocatlán and Tzompantepec. The government consists of a president, a syndic and seven representatives called regidors.

Outside of the city there are three main communities: Benito Juárez with 3,150 inhabitants, Ignacio Zaragoza with 4,523 and San José Xicohténcatl with 3,899. All of these are rural communities with economies based on agriculture and livestock.

In addition the municipality contains multiple haciendas, most of which have been broken up but some still in operation as private property. They include San Cristóbal Lagunas (established 18th century), El Balcón (19th century), Santa Barbara (18th century), La Compañía (17th century), Guadalupe (late 19th century), San Francisco Soltepec (18th century), San Diego Notario (18th century), San Martín Notario (18th century), El Molino (19th century), La Natividad (18th century), San Francisco Tecoac (19th century), San Miguel Báez (19th century), Santa Ana Ríos (18th century), Santiago Brito (19th century), Santo Domingo (19th century), Xalpatlahuaya (18th century), San Antonio Atenco (late 19th century), Xonecuila (late 19th century) and San Pedro El Batán (18th century). In the municipality, there are twenty one archeological sites. In the Santa Anita neighborhood of the city, there are pre Hispanic columns on private property.

== Geography ==
The municipality is located in the eastern half of the state of Tlaxcala, in the Central Mexican Highlands. It has an average altitude of 2,500 meters above sea level. The geography of the municipality has three types of relief. About twenty percent is rugged mountain (located in the far north and far south), about thirty percent is semi-flat (located I the north and south and over half which is flat, in the center. Its far south is part of the Malinche Volcano.

=== Hydrography ===
The surface water of the area consists of small streams, most of which run only during the rainy season, running south to north. These have created ravines such as those called Tecoac, Xonemila, San Luca and Los Plares. Most of the water supply is from underground, accessed through 62 wells.

=== Climate ===
The climate is semi dry and temperate. Most rain falls during the rainy season from May to September with an average annual rainfall of 119.3 mm. The warmest months are from March to May and the coldest in December and January. The average annual minimum is 5.4 °C and the average annual maximum is 23.2 °C.

=== Flora and fauna ===
About thirty five percent of the municipality has wild vegetation, mostly near La Malinche. This vegetation varies by altitude with holm oak species prevalent in the lower elevations along with some pines and bushes. Above 2,800 meters, oyamel fir (Abies religiosa) and pines (Pinus hartwegii) can be found. Above 4,300 meters alpine grasslands and a juniper (Juniperus monticola) are found. In total, over sixty percent of the tree species are conifers and the rest are broad-leafed.

Although most of the flat areas are used for cultivation and grazing, some wild species remain such as maguey (Agave horrida and Agave salmiana), sotol (Nolina longifolia), Yucca filifera, Senecio praecox, Opuntia hyticantha, Opuntia robusta and Mammilaria magnimamma. Wildlife is mostly found outside the urban area and includes rabbits (Silvilagus floridanus), hares (Lepus californicus), birds and reptiles.

== History ==
=== Pre Hispanic period ===
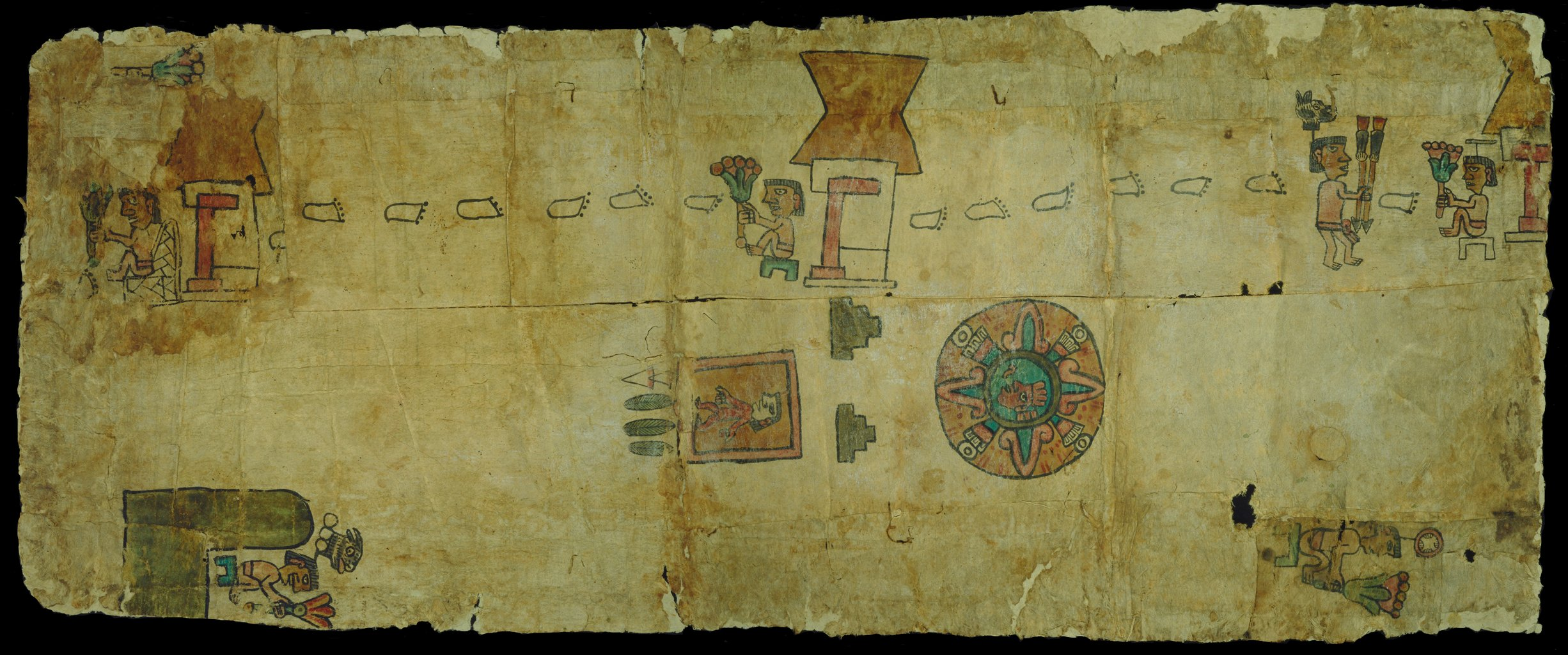
Portion of the Huamantla Codex

The first settlement in the Huamantla area was south of the current city. It became one of thirteen villages which formed a political union that lasted from 1800 to 1200 BCE and at its height had a population of about 3,500 inhabitants. The village near Huamantla extended over an area of between three and five hectares. The next regional center of power was in a settlement which is now an archeological site called Los Cerritos de Natividad, east of Huamantla, whose influence extended over fourteen communities. This era is distinguished with the building of pyramid and planned urban centers.

This was followed by the Texoloc era, with its center of power at Tlalencaleca between 800 and 600 BCE. Architecture included talud-tablero pyramids and ceramics which show influence from the west of Mexico and the Gulf coast. The following Tezoquipan era is considered to be the cultural and technological apex of the region reflected by its water system, architecture and trade connections. This era extended from 350 BCE to 100 CE, and at its height included 297 settlements, fourteen of which were major cities. What is now Huamantla was three of these settlements, with pyramids and planned layouts centered on a plaza.

The decline of this area is called the Tenanyecac phase, which lasts from 100–650 CE. The decline is due to the rise of Teotihuacan and Cholula. People migrated away from the Tlaxcala area and eventually the zone became tributary provinces of the two powers. Teotihuacan established a trade corridor through Huamantla to connect it to points east and south, but no major settlements.

Sometime after this, between 650 and 900 CE, there began Otomi migration into the Huamantla Valley and other parts of Tlaxcala in various waves. There is also evidence of Olmeca-Xicalanca and Tlaxco influence, with the rise of Cacaxtla. The fall of Teotihuacan allowed for local control of the trade corridor. However, from then until the colonial period, the major cultural force was Otomi. Much of this history is known from the Huamantla Codex, the largest document of its kind and one of the few that document the history of an Otomi people. It is in nine fragments, seven at the National Library of Anthropology and History in Mexico City and two in Germany at the Berlin State Library. The central story of the codex is a battle between newly arrived Otomis against those already established and aligned with Tlaxco at Atlangatepec. Victory went to the newcomers, allowing them passage and settlement near the Malinche Volcano, called the Tecoac dominion. These Tecoac Otomi were still a political force when the Spanish arrived. The document was likely commissioned shortly after the conquest, possibly by the Franciscans as the church and monastery of Huamantla are represented.

The last indigenous consolidation of power in Huamantla was the creation of the Tlaxcallan dominion, from which the state gets its name. This was a Chichimeca political union that formed around 1100 CE, pushed out the Olmeca-Xilcalancas and divided the territory into four interdependent dominions. Otomi immigration still continued to the area after this, especially after the fall of Tula in 1168. Huamantla belonged to the dominion of Tecoac, one of the four that made up the Tlaxcallan kingdom. This area was first to have contact with Cortés and his army which made an incursion here in 1519 to be attacked, mostly by Otomi vassals. It was the first time the Spanish used their advanced weaponry and quickly dispersed the native soldiers.

=== Colonial period ===
Tlaxcala's role in the Conquest of Mexico allowed indigenous authorities to maintain a number of privileges with Spanish settlers. In 1528, an indigenous delegation went to Spain and one of their tasks was to solicit permission to found the settlement of Huamantla, with the name of San Luis Cuahmanco as the successor to Tzatlán, one of the indigenous power centers. Permission was granted in 1535, but Antonio de Mendoza ignored the royal seal and assigned lands here to Alonso Muñoz Camargo, Francisco Luca García, Eugenio Leal Chocolatzin, Diego Guevara and Juan de Aquino in the center of the new town as founders and outlying lands to forty other families between 1539 and 1543. The following monarch Phillip II disavowed the order. This prompted the Cabildo de Indios (Indian Council) to send an ambassador to Spain, with the Lienzo de Tlaxcala to remind the Crown of its obligations.

Evangelization of the area was done by the Franciscans starting in 1524. The order began construction of the San Luis Obispo monastery in 1567 by Friar Pedro Meléndez. It was completed in 1585 and replaced the ceremonial center of Tizatlan as the area's major religious center. This was followed by the establishment of school and eleven hermitages and churches around the city still found in the neighborhoods of El Calvario, La Trinidad, La Santa Cruz, San Miguel, San Juan, San Francisco, San Sebastián, Santa Ana, San Antonio, La Caridad and San Diego. Huamantla quickly became the regional center for eastern Tlaxcala with an agricultural economy that converted the valley from forest to farmland by the end of the 16th century producing corn, wheat, sheep and more. Spanish incursion here was mostly due to the buying of land from indigenous authorities, but the labor supply on which these Spanish depended was mostly controlled by the Cabildo de Indios in the city of Tlaxcala. For this reason, the Spanish in Huamantla petitioned colonial authorities to divide the province, separating Huamantla from the city of Tlaxcala. However, in 1654, viceroy Duke of Albuquerque denied the petition. Despite this, Spanish landholdings continued to rise.

Another tactic by the Spanish was to move control of parish churches from the Franciscan friars to regular clergy under the control of the bishop of Puebla in the mid 17th century. This was opposed by the Franciscans and caused instability as the regular priests did not speak Otomi and did not comply with promises to protect the indigenous against Spanish abuses. They also appropriated belongings of indigenous brotherhoods.

Despite setbacks, indigenous authorities managed to maintain more influence here than in other parts of New Spain in keeping Spanish landholders in check. It even allowed the Cabildo in Tlaxcala to demand more influence over local authorities in Huamantla and even led to direct election of the mayor by the local, mostly indigenous, population in 1741.

A second attempt to separate Huamantla from the city of Tlaxcala occurred in the second half of the 18th century, but this was also unsuccessful. However, during this time, the population became less indigenous in more influx of Spanish and criollos, lessening the influence of the Cabildo de Indios. Haciendas of the area consolidated. Those of Huamantla tended to be smaller but more productive because of the wetter climate and better soils.

In 1785, colonial authorities integrated Tlaxcala as part of the province of Puebla, but this was reversed in 1793. At this time, Tlaxcala reorganized into seven "cuarteles," one of which being Huamantla, which included Cuapiaxtla, San Juan Ixtenco, San Nicolás Terrenate and San Pablo Zitlaltepec along with the city.

=== Independence to 21st century ===
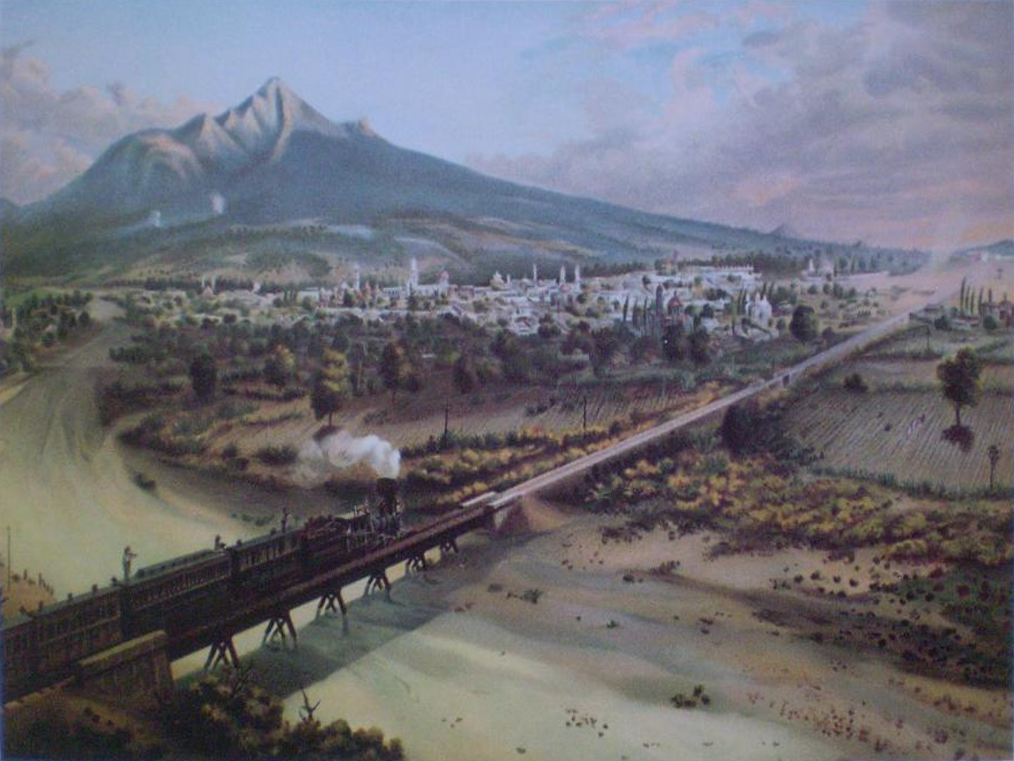
View of Huamantla from San Lucas Bridge (1877) by Casimiro Castro

In 1810, most of the indigenous population of the state supported the movement of Miguel Hidalgo y Costilla, but as the territory was surrounded by royalist Puebla, attempts to participate in the Mexican War of Independence were stifled. However, there were small insurrections in Huamantla as well as Tlaxco and Calpulalpan. In 1821, near the end of the war, Tlaxcalan authorities openly supported the Plan de Iguala.

Huamantla gained municipality status in 1822, but shortly after, there was another effort to unite Tlaxcala with Puebla. Efforts to keep Tlaxcala an independent state were led by the parish priest of Huamantla, Miguel Valentín, which eventually prevailed due to opposition to the empire model and in favor of a federal republic. The state proclaimed in 1846 was reorganized into three divisions, Tlaxcala, Tlaxco and Huamantla. In 1847 the city acquired the title of "heroic" because of its participation in efforts against US invasion during the Mexican American War.

During the Reform War, Huamantla the capital of Tlaxcala was briefly moved to Huamantla by Conservative forces in 1858 and the city was taken by the French in 1863. The capital moved back to the city of Tlaxcala after the ouster of the French. During the rest of the century the city grew with the construction of a railroad, which allowed haciendas to have access to markets in Mexico City as well as the states of Puebla, Hidalgo and Veracruz. Haciendas grew in number, size and power into the early 20th century, even takingover lands which had previously been communal and unilaterally restricting water supply to the city.

As in the rest of Mexico, discontent with the Porfirio Díaz regime grew as haciendas required employees to work from 4 am to 7 pm and paid them only in coupons good at the hacienda store. At the first sign of rebellion during the Mexican Revolution, the Porfirian governor of Tlaxcala dispatched troops to Huamantla and other places and was able to suppress early efforts such as that by Juan Cuamatzi, who was executed on February 26, 1911. Soon after the mayor of Huamantla along with others resigned his position. Later, the San Diego del Pinar Hacienda in the municipality was attacked by Zapatistas in 1913 and then later the same year by rebels fleeing the federal army. The second attacked was repelled by the hacienda. In that same year the first revolutionary troops took control of the city.

After the Revolution ended, Huamantla grew again adding commerce and industry to its economy. In the 1940s, the first modern factories were built, making powdered milk and cream, cookies pork cold cuts, fertilizer and mole. These were followed by various others producing clothing and other textiles.

Telephone service was established in 1932. Media channels were also established such as newspapers and radio station XEHT, which still operates. The first flights to the city occurred in 1953.

The city has since grown to include sprawling suburbs. In 2007, the city was named a "Pueblo Mágico" by the Mexican government's tourism secretariat, in part because of its celebrations to the Virgin of Charity and the Huamantlada in August. To achieve the designation, it also renovated much of its downtown, especially Parque Juárez.

== Economy ==
The municipality's economy is still heavily agricultural, with almost a third of its workforce dedicated to crops and livestock. Another third works in mining and industry (including handcrafts) and the last third in commerce and services. Over half of the municipality's territory is used for farming and grazing but agriculture's role has been diminishing. In 2009, the municipality had 24,424 hectares under cultivation with crops such as corn, beans, wheat, animal feed, peaches and rye. Livestock includes cattle (mostly dairy), pigs, sheep, goats and domestic fowl.

There are thirteen major industrial sites mostly producing food products. Other facilities include those making metal products, pharmaceuticals, plastic and leather goods. Traditional crafts include amate paper, mostly done by the Otomis, along with pottery, textiles, masks and dolls make from dried corn husks.

Commerce and services is the fastest-growing sector of the economy. The city is the starting point for a tourist route called "Huamantla and the East."

The municipality has 153.1 km of highways mostly secondary and rural roads.

== Education ==
The municipality has 163 schools from preschool to college level. Most are public schools with 29 being private. College level institutions include the Universidad Tecnológical del Tlaxcala and the Instituto Franciscano de Oriente. There is also a campus of the Universidad Popular Autónoma del Estado de Puebla which provides high school and college level education.

The municipality has an illiteracy rate of about eight percent, above the state average of 6.7 percent.

== Sister city ==
- (Mexico) Salvatierra, Guanajuato
