= Huapalcalco =

Pre-Columbian Mesoamerican archeological site

- Location within Mexico Location within Hidalgo
- 20.11702°N 98.3624°W
- Type: Mesoamerican
- Periods: Preclassic, Classic, Postclassic
- Cultures: Olmeca-Xicalanca – Toltec
- Location: Huapalcalco, Tulancingo, Hidalgo, Mexico
- Region: Mesoamerica

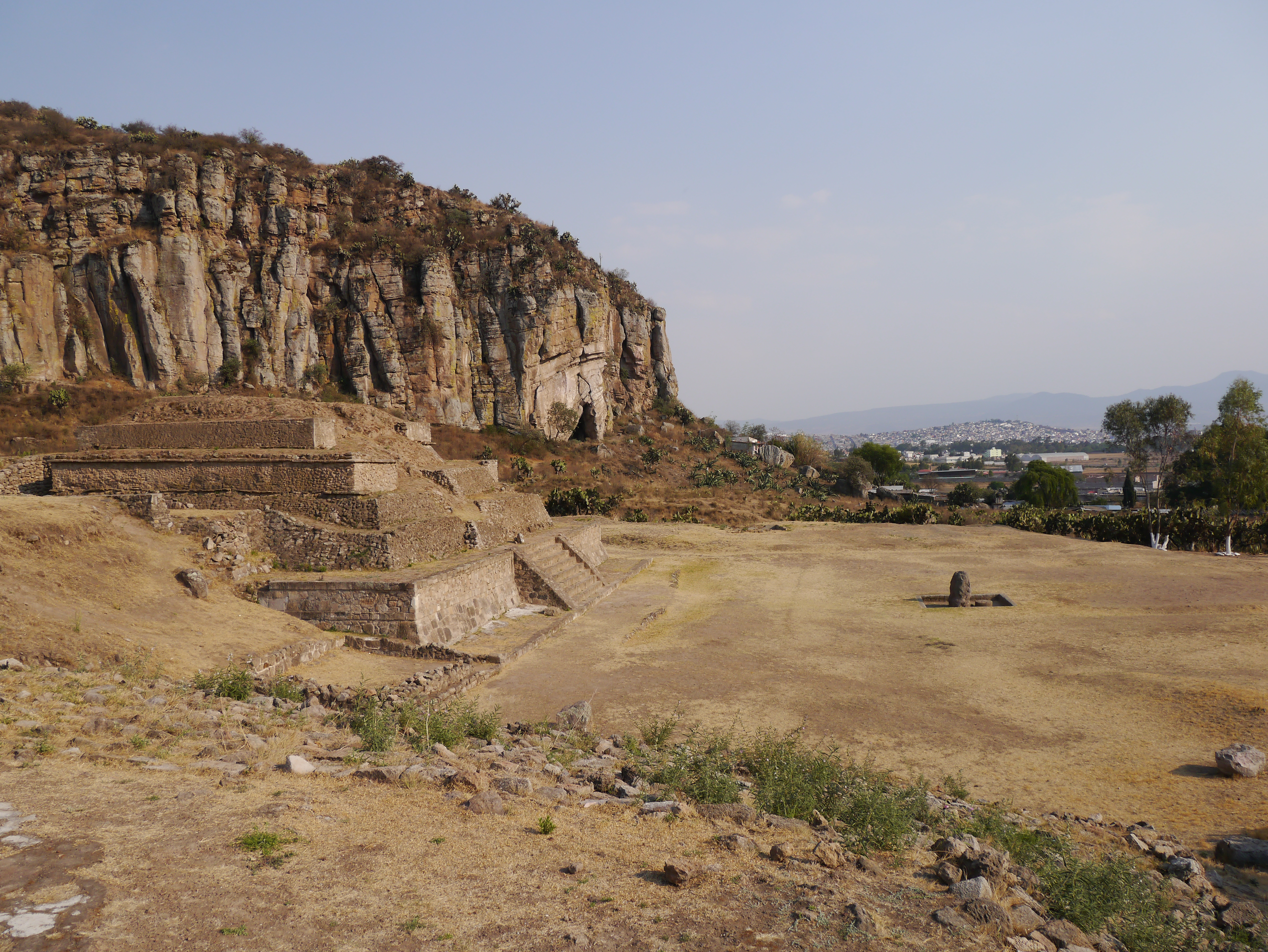
Huapalcalco (Pyramid) Archaeological Site, established during Toltec Period (100–650 CE)

Huapalcalco is a pre-Columbian Mesoamerican archaeological site located approximately 5 kilometres (3.1 mi) north of Tulancingo, in the state of Hidalgo, Mexico. The site is situated on the western slope of a hill known as Tecolote. The slope is divided east–west by a ravine, which creates two sectors at the foot of the hill and two more at the top, all containing archaeological remains. Artifacts recovered from the site date back to around 13,000 years before present, corresponding to the earliest known human settlement in the region.

Huapalcalco is believed to have been an important civil, religious, and urban centre. Huapalcalco flourished during the Mesoamerican Classic period (100–650 CE) and was associated with the state of Teotihuacan. While its architecture and ceramics show Teotihuacan influence, they also display distinctive features. The precise culture that constructed the monuments remains unidentified, although the site is considered closely related to Teotihuacan and shows additional influence from Gulf Coast cultures, notably the Olmeca-Xicalanca. Huapalcalco was part of the second Toltec Empire, preceding the rise of Tula, and some traditions hold that Topilitzin Quetzalcóatl resided there before ruling Tula.

Evidence suggests the existence of wooden structures, though their exact function is unknown. One of these may have served as a Telpochcalli, a facility dedicated to military training, the administration of justice, or the teaching of dance and music.

== Background ==
During the Lithic period (10,000–3500 BCE), the first evidence of hunter-gatherer groups appeared in the valley. The gradual transition to the Archaic period (8000–2000 BCE) marked the beginnings of permanent settlements in Mesoamerica, alongside the development of agriculture.

The Preclassic, or Formative stage, (2000 BCE–250 CE), saw the emergence of the Olmec civilization, considered the first major Mesoamerican culture. During the Classic period (250–900 CE), Tulancingo developed into an important trade centre, with road networks and residential areas. It was in this period that Huapalcalco was constructed, the remains of which include a three-sided pyramid and a stairway built in the Toltec style.

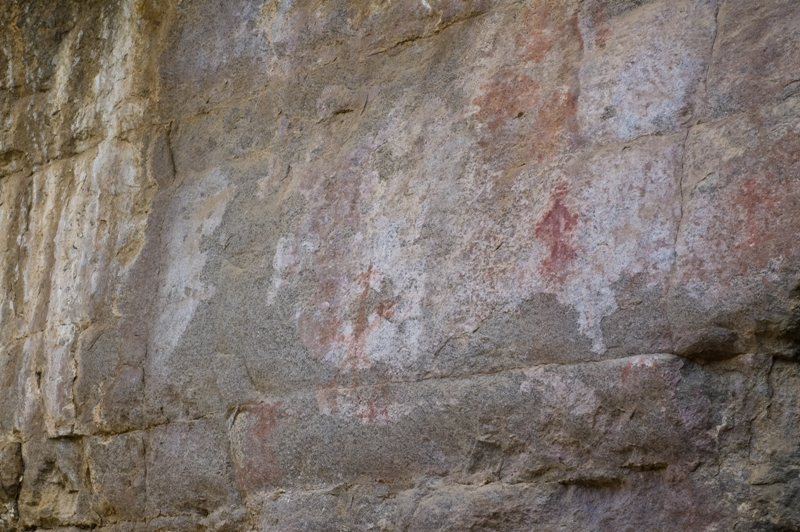
Cave paintings in the area

=== Cave paintings ===
The earliest cave paintings in the region are located on Huiztle Hill and the Huapalcalco plateau. These paintings provide evidence of the life experiences of early groups through depictions of humans, schematic outlines, and astronomical figures, and have been dated to around 9000 BCE.

Among the representations are a lizard and several human figures. One depicts a man throwing a primitive form of the atlátl, a spear-throwing device with an extended arm mechanism. The weapon, equipped with a large dart, was primarily used for hunting waterfowl, which are believed to have existed in large numbers in a lagoon situated west of the site.

These paintings are attributed to hunter-gatherer groups that did not practise animal domestication but demonstrated knowledge of hunting and the controlled use of fire for cooking.

=== Legend of Huapalcalco ===
According to local legend, the city of Huapalcalco (also called Coapalcallico) was punished by the gods because its inhabitants were unable to defend it from invading groups, who subsequently built their own structures over it.

The gods, angered by this failure, buried the city completely. The mythical city was said to have covered an area of approximately 10 square kilometres (3.9 mi^{2}), stretching from Huapalcalco to Trapiche de Abra, Santiago de Anaya, and Acatlán.

The legend holds that the curse could only be lifted on 24 June at midnight. At that precise moment, a bridge would appear between the Coapalcallico hills, above the main pyramid. Only a person—a man, woman, or child—with the purest and bravest soul could cross the bridge. On reaching the other side, the individual would find a golden chain; by pulling it, the buried city would be restored.

== Tulancingo city-state ==
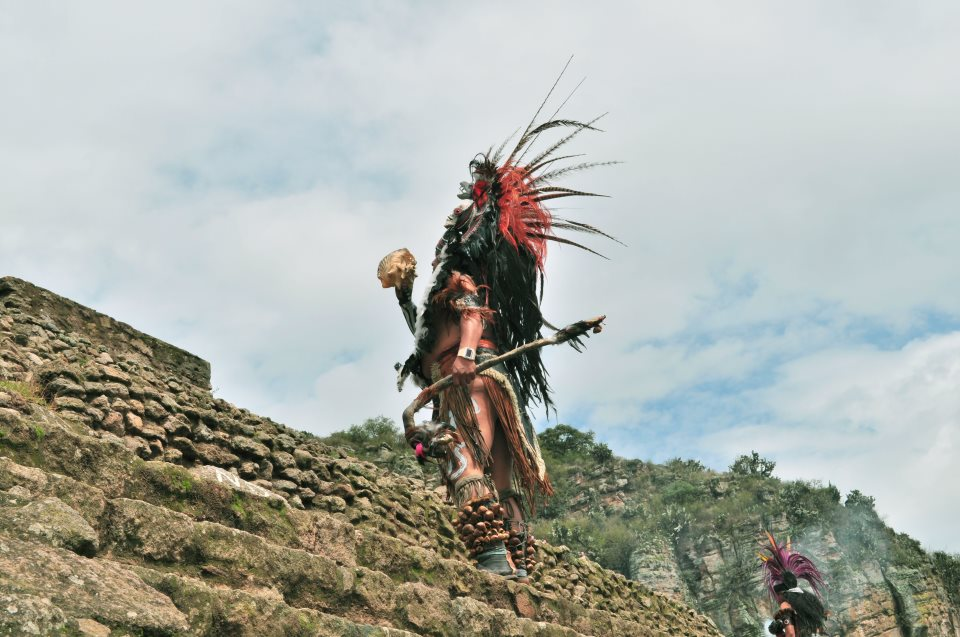
An "Aztec" ritual-reenactment being performed on the Huapalcalco Pyramid

Tulancingo is considered a forerunner of the Teotihuacan civilization. Its name derives from the Nahuatl words tule and tzintle, meaning "in or behind the reeds," a meaning confirmed by its Aztec glyph.

The area is home to some of the oldest known settlements in Mesoamerica, including Huapalcalco and El Pedregal. These early settlements have been attributed to the Olmecs, Xicalancas, and other groups. The city was founded in 645 BCE by the Toltecs under the name Tolancingo, as part of the empire centred in Tula. During this period, the city contained schools and temples. A calendar stone was carved there, and a temple known as Mitlancalco was constructed to receive the remains of priests and princes. Following the decline of the Toltec empire after 1116 CE, the city was abandoned.

According to the Tribute Codex (Códice de los Tributos), the Tulancingo area served as a commercial centre for the Otomi-Tepehua and Totonac peoples from about 1000 CE, attracting traders from the regions now within the states of Hidalgo, Puebla, and Veracruz. This trading tradition continues in the Thursday tianguis (open-air market).

The Chichimecas, under King Xolotl, assumed control of the area around 1120 CE. The city was refounded by the Chichimecas and the remaining Toltecs, with its population later reinforced by the arrival of the Tlaxcaltecas. In 1324, King Quinantzin reorganized the region politically, designating Tulancingo as the head of a province. Tulancingo waged war against Texcoco but was defeated. In the early 15th century, Texcoco, under Huitzilihuitl, conquered Tulancingo and incorporated it into the Aztec Empire. In 1431, Itzcoatl and Nezahualcoyotl reorganized the region politically once again.

By 1416, Tulancingo had become part of the Texcoco domain and subsequently came under direct Aztec control. It was divided into two sectors: Tlaixpa, to the east, inhabited mostly by the Otomi; and Tlatoca, to the west, inhabited primarily by the Nahua. Both sectors paid tribute to the Aztec state, providing goods such as cotton blankets, maize, and amaranth.

Although Tulancingo was a tributary of the Mexica, it retained some degree of administrative autonomy, with local authorities chosen by the community. The city also served as an important food storage and distribution centre for the Aztec Empire.

=== Olmeca-Xicallanca ===
The decline of Teotihuacan around 700 CE marked the end of the Middle Classic period in northern Mesoamerica. This collapse allowed regional centres to flourish, competing for control of trade routes and natural resources. The Late Classic era was characterised by political fragmentation, with no single city achieving hegemony. Migrations from Aridoamerica and northern regions displaced established populations southward. Among the new arrivals were the Nahua, who would later found Tula and Tenochtitlan, capitals of the Postclassic period.

At the same time, groups from the south established themselves in central Mexico. Among these were the Olmeca-Xicallanca, who migrated from the Yucatán Peninsula and founded centres such as Cacaxtla and Xochicalco. The Olmeca-Xicallanca should not be confused with the Preclassic Olmec civilization. They are identified as a distinct cultural group that influenced nearby regions. Each city-state is thought to have been governed by two rulers, known as tahualz, who ruled independently of other centres.

Their writing system is believed to have included at least ten symbols, including pictograms representing the sun, the moon, a tree, a harvest field, and a human figure. Their religion was polytheistic, with the sun god considered the most important deity, although worship names differed among their settlements.

Other Olmec-Xicalanca sites include:

- Cantona (Mesoamerican site)
- Cacaxtla
- Cholula (Mesoamerican site)
- Xochicalco

== The site ==
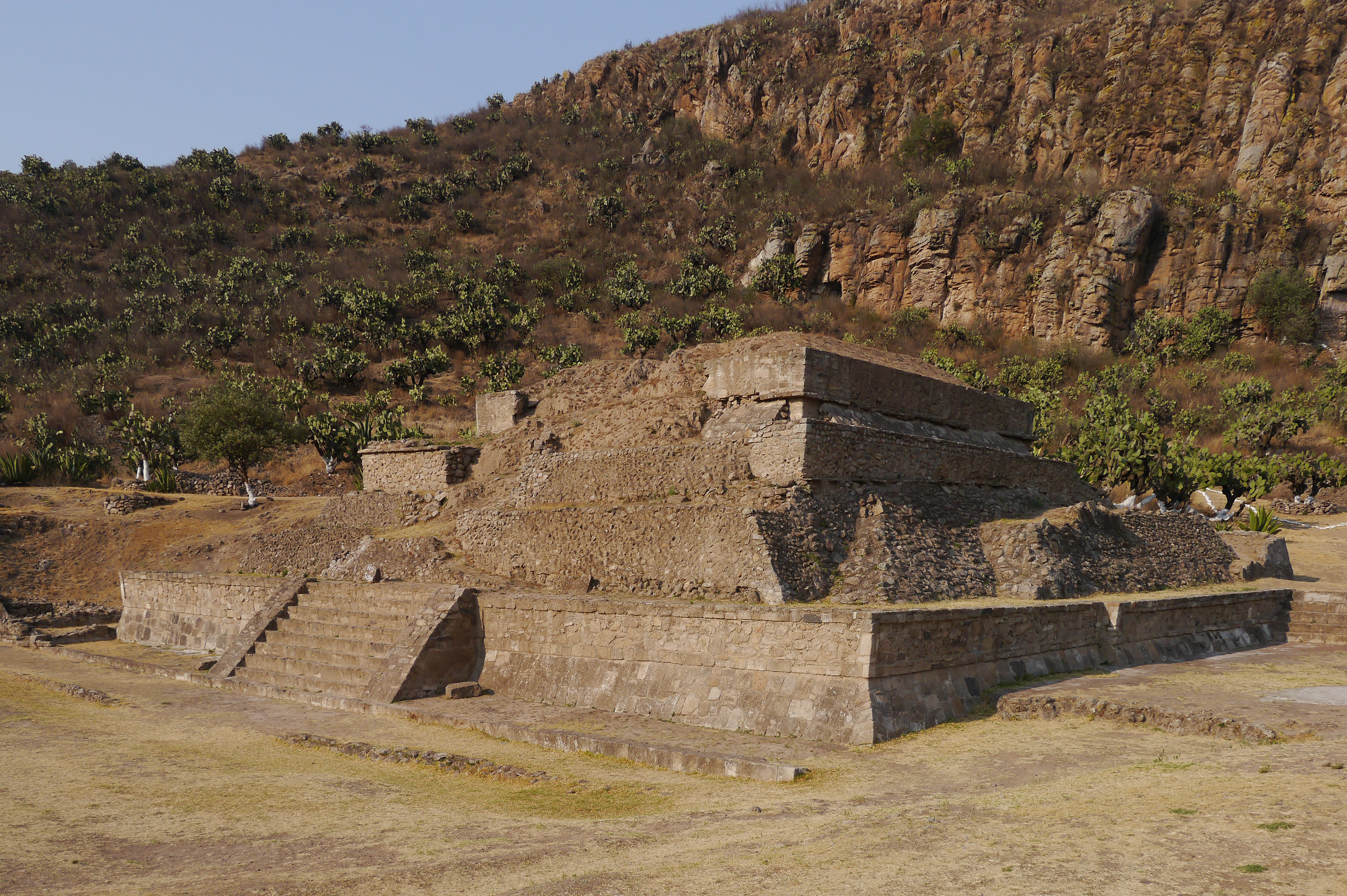
The Huapalcalco Pyramid is considered to show Teotihuacan influence, although it was not designed by the builders of the Valley of the Sun pyramids, located about 80 kilometres (50 mi) away.

Huapalcalco corresponds to the Mesoamerican Classic period (100–650 CE) and was associated with the state of Teotihuacan. However, its architecture and ceramics differ from those of Teotihuacan. While the site clearly reflects Teotihuacan influence, its monuments are not of Teotihuacan origin. The identity of the builders remains unknown, although the site shows both strong Teotihuacan cultural connections and influence from Gulf Coast cultures.

=== Investigations ===
The northwestern sector of the site, considered one of the most important areas, was first explored in 1954 by archaeologists Florencia Jacobs Müller and César Lizardi Ramos. After nine expeditions, concluding in 1959, they uncovered a pyramid complex with clear Teotihuacan features, along with a plaza containing a Stele of apparent Maya influence, Totonac yokes, and a round altar.

The discovery of Totonac yokes highlights the influence of Gulf Coast cultures. Other findings include a sculpture of the Teotihuacan god of fire.

Excavations in the deepest layers of one of the buildings revealed Meserve-type arrowheads, associated with pre-ceramic cultures dating to around 7000 BCE. This chronology corresponds with a prehistoric hand axe discovered in a burned cave on the cliffs of El Tecolote Hill. The same area also contained cave paintings dominated by red pigments, depicting geometric and human figures, which suggest the presence of Palaeolithic groups in Huapalcalco around 10,000 BCE.

More recently, the foundations of a pyramid built with stone slabs and finished with stucco were identified at the highest point of El Tecolote Hill, on its southeastern corner. A symmetrical monument, still unexplored, is located on the northeastern side of the ravine in a place known locally as Iglesias Viejas.

Huapalcalco covers an area of 39 hectares, within which more than 55 families currently reside. The officially designated archaeological zone is enclosed within a 4-hectare perimeter.

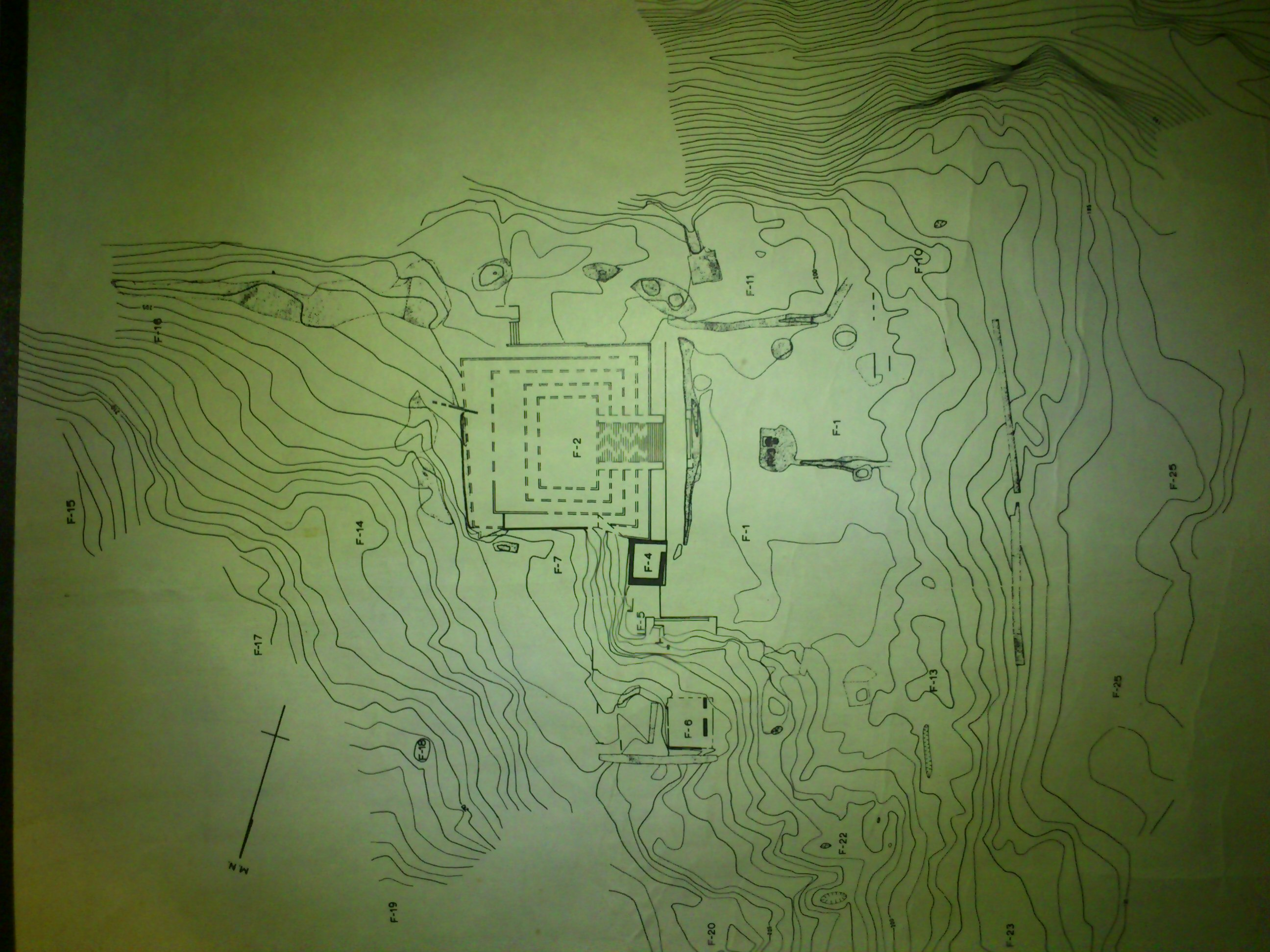
Topographic map of Huapalcalco

== Toponymy ==
The name Huapalcalco comes from the Nahuatl words huapalli ("board" or "small beam"), calli ("house"), and -co (a locative suffix), which together mean "place of the wooden house."

The Huapalcalco glyph depicts a battlemented building with three doors, apparently made of wood, and differs from the common calli glyph. It represents the idea of huapalcalli (or vapalcalli), meaning "tent" or "house of boards." The name is derived from calli ("house") and huapalli or huapalitl ("board" or "small beam"), forming huapal-cal-co, or "in the house of boards," that is, "the wooden building."

=== Structures ===
The site contains a Teotihuacan-influenced three-sided pyramid, measuring 12 metres at the base and 8 metres in height, with an altar that may have been used for sacrificial offerings.

There are approximately 28 knolls—small, buried pyramids—on which no formal archaeological work has been carried out.

The hillside is divided by a ravine, which in colonial times was described by friar Bernardino de Sahagún as a place with "crystalline water cascades, at the foot stones, women were washing clothes while children swam and plunged into water."

Cave paintings are scattered over the stones of the ravine, particularly on Cerro La Mesa behind the pyramid. Many of these paintings are difficult to distinguish due to modern graffiti. In addition, white crosses have been painted on the stones by local inhabitants, who believe they ward off witches and nahuales (shape-shifters).

Between the rocky crags of the slope are several caves, where local residents often place altars to honour the dead. In front of the Tecolote Cave, the remains of a prehistoric human were found. Radiocarbon dating indicated that the individual lived about 10,000 years ago. The remains are currently held in the National Museum of Anthropology in Mexico City, in the Prehistoric Room.

=== Vandalism ===
The Huapalcalco archaeological zone, regarded as one of Tulancingo's key cultural heritage sites, has suffered acts of vandalism.

==== Source of construction materials ====
Stones from the pre-Hispanic ruins at Huapalcalco have been used by local residents for the construction of houses. This practice occurred due to inadequate oversight by the Hidalgo state delegation of the National Institute of Anthropology and History (INAH).

==== Claims of neglect ====
The site has at times been described as neglected, with insufficient maintenance. This contributed to damage to the cave paintings—some more than 10,000 years old—which have been affected by graffiti, bonfire soot, and general vandalism, as well as alleged employee negligence.

Access to the site was historically limited. Visitors once entered through a side road off the federal highway to Tuxpan, near Tulancingo, marked only by a rusted signboard with a barely visible INAH logo.

As of January 2014, however, the road to the site has been visibly marked with blue INAH signs, and staff are present to assist visitors.

== Bibliography ==
- Menes Llaguno, Juan Manuel. Historia mínima del Estado de Hidalgo, 2006. M.A. Porrúa 9707016949 (in Spanish)
- Ballesteros, Víctor M. & Cuatepotzo Costeira, Miguel Ángel. Canto de Sol, Hidalgo; Tierra, historia y gente (2003) Sistema de Educación Pública del Estado de Hidalgo, Pachuca, Hidalgo. 9687517212 (in Spanish)
