= Olmeca-Xicallanca =

Mesoamerican population group

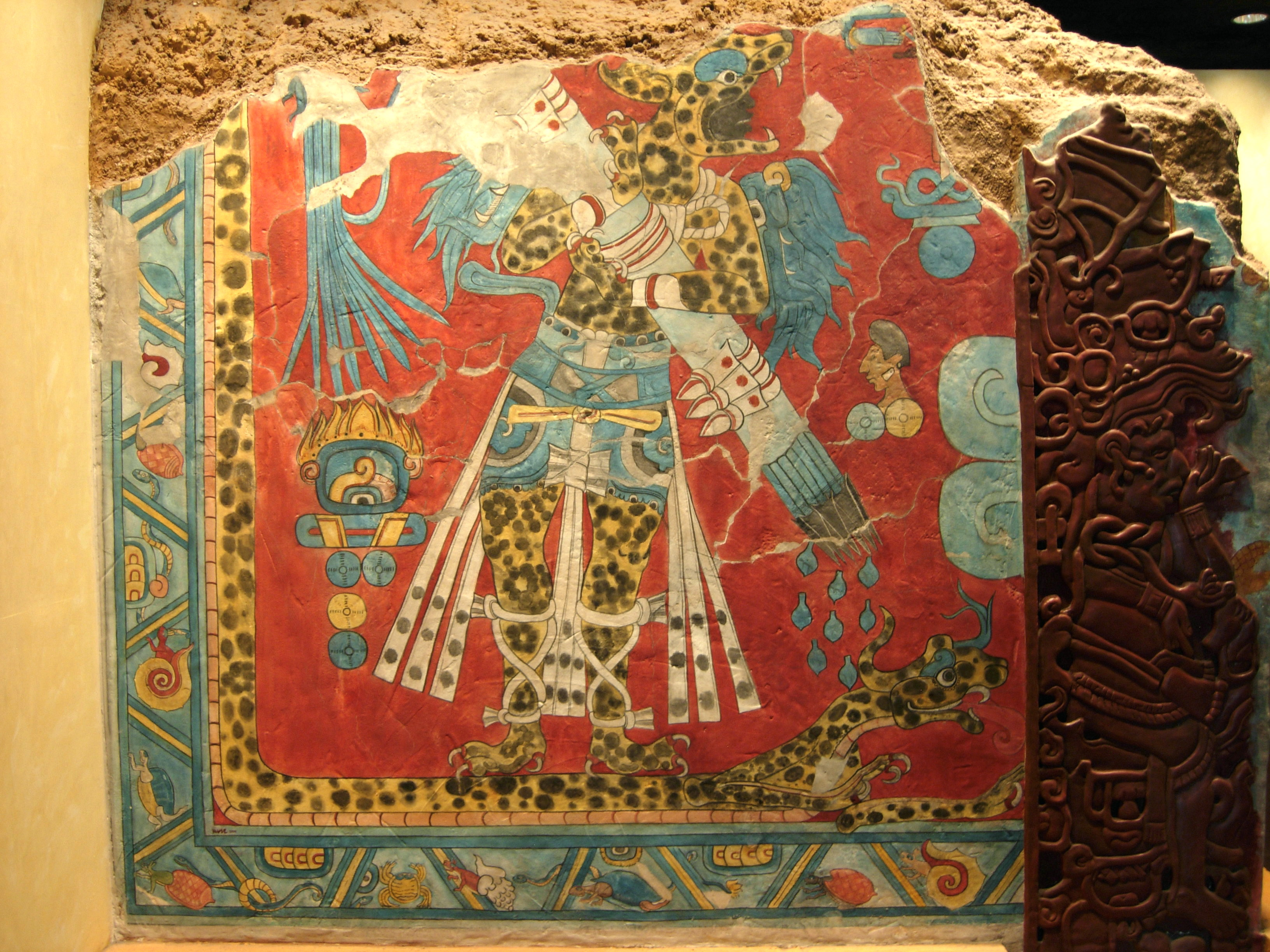
- Olmec-Xicalanca Cacaxtla, Jaguar Knight Mural

Languages
- Original language unknown; later partially adopted Nahuatl

The Olmeca-Xicallanca, also known as the Historic Olmecs, were a people that dominated parts of central Mexico during the Mesoamerican Epiclassic Period (after the seventh century). They should not be confused with the preclassic Olmec culture, although it is possible that they originate from the same geographic area. They are mentioned in the Historia Tolteca-Chichimeca and works of Chimalpahin and Diego Muñoz Camargo.

The Olmeca-Xicallanca are believed to be the builders of Cacaxtla in what is now the state of Tlaxcala. Cacaxtla is known for its impressive murals, some of the most extensive and well-preserved in Mesoamerica.

== History ==
The origin of the Olmeca-Xicallanca is poorly understood. The "Olmeca" portion of their name implies a connection with the region of Olman in the southern Gulf coast, whereas "Xicallanca" is connected with Xicalango, a toponym connected with both the Laguna de Términos (particularly Ciudad del Carmen) and Boca del Río, Veracruz. This has led many authors to assert that they originate from these areas or are related to the Chontal Maya, despite Spanish chroniclers designating Xicalango as the place where they later settled rather than their original home.

According to legend, the Olmeca-Xicallanca came from Chicomoztoc and are descended from Iztac Mixcoatl who had six sons with his wife Ilancueitl. Each son settled a region of Mexico. The third and fourth, Ulmecatl and Xicalancatl, were the ancestors of the Olmeca-Xicallanca. They crossed mountains and volcanos to settle in Cuernavaca, Chalco and Cholula. However, a northern origin of the Olmeca-Xicallanca has been doubted, and it was perhaps invented on the basis of them speaking the Nahuatl language.

Mexican archaeologist Wigberto Jiménez-Moreno proposed that the Olmeca-Xicallanca were originally groups speaking Mixtec and Popoloca that later adopted Nahuatl, and that their modern descendants are Nahuatl speakers in the south of Veracruz and the Sierra Norte de Puebla.

Jiménez-Moreno, analyzing the account of Fray Juan de Torquemada, dates the Olmec conquest of Cholula between 740 and 800 CE. He claims that shortly thereafter they extended their influence to the vicinity of Cempoala, Cerro de las Mesas and Los Tuxtlas on the Gulf coast, which triggered Pipil migrations to Central America. By 1100 CE, the Olmeca-Xicallanca dominated a significant portion of the Puebla-Tlaxcala Valley. In the twelfth century, Toltec refugees fleeing the collapse of Tula settled in Chalco and Cholula and accepted Olmeca rule as slaves. In the year 1 Flint (which could correlate with either 1168, 1240 or 1292), they were conquered by migrating Chichimecas who eventually created new polities in the region, including the confederacy of Tlaxcala. Some Olmeca stayed in the region and became subjects of the new rulers, while others migrated, particularly to Xicalango but also to the Sierra Norte de Puebla around Zacatlán.

== Political organization ==
The Olmeca-Xicallanca "empire" was organized as a federation of allied towns, not unlike the later Aztec Empire. Each province of the polity had its own capital. Known capitals include Xaltepec (near Tecamachalco), Amecameca and Xocoyocan (near Tlaxcala), mentioned by the Historia Tolteca-Chichimeca, Chimalpahin and Muñoz Camargo respectively. Under the Olmeca, Cholula was ruled as a diarchy of priest-kings of Quetzalcoatl. One was titled tlalchiach ("lord of the earth") and bore a jaguar emblem, while the other was titled aquiach ("lord of the sky") and bore an eagle emblem. The two rulers resided in different locations, and the diarchy may have corresponded to a broader distinction between calpullis within ancient Cholula.

== Religious beliefs ==
Chimalpahin describes an Olmeca-Xicallanca water cult in which rain, springs, mountains and lakes were considered sacred. He also mentions that the peoples who later settled the area regarded them as powerful sorcerers.

== See also ==
- Cantona (archaeological site)
- Huapalcalco
- Xochicalco

== Bibliography ==
- Diego Muñoz Camargo, Historia de Tlaxcala, 16th century
- David Drew, The Lost Chronicles of the Maya Kings, Phoenix, London, 2000
- Fernando De Alva Ixtlixóchitl, Historia Tolteca-Chichimeca, codex, 16th century
- John Eric Thompson, Historia y religión de los mayas, Mexico, 1975
