= Mapa de Cuauhtinchan No. 2 =

16th-century map

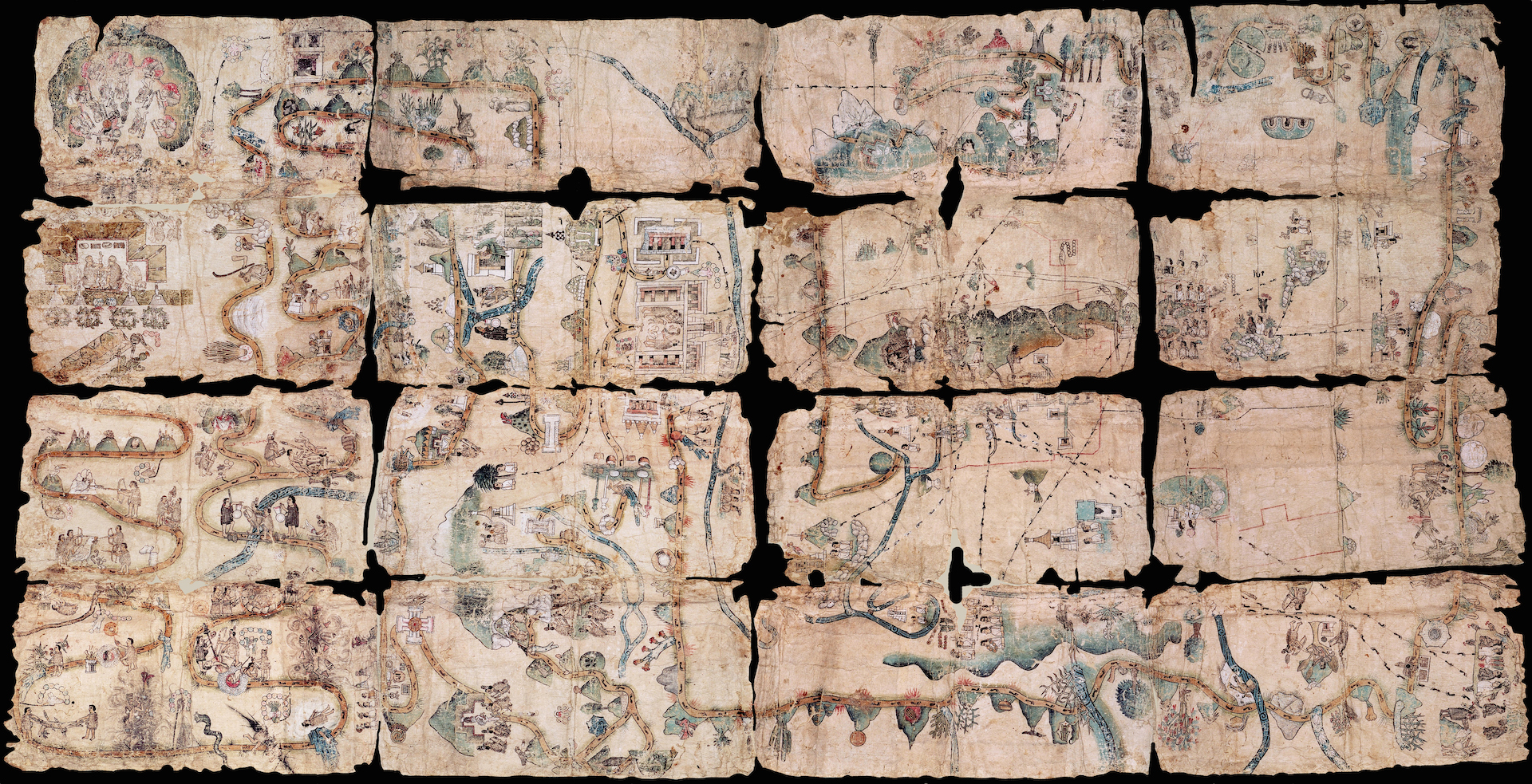
Mapa de Cuauhtinchan no. 2

Mapa de Cuauhtinchan No. 2 (Cuauhtinchan Map #2, also known in the literature by the abbreviation MC2) is one of five indigenous maps from the sixteenth century Valley of Puebla, that documents the history of the Chichimeca Cucuhtinchantlacas. This map is a post-conquest document done in amate paper in a traditional cartographic history style very common in Mesoamerica (Boone, 2000) and used to recount creation myths, migrations, battles and allegiances, and to document lineages and territorial boundaries (Reyes, 1977).

== Mapping ==
Mapmaking is a cultural expression evidenced in different forms in any human community over time and space: From fourth century BC (400 BC) China to nineteenth century Europe, maps have been a medium that materialized or translated man's relationship to the world around it; as Harley puts it “There are few aspects of human action and thought that have not been mapped at one time or another” (Harley, 1991). Maps are a representation of place. As part of the Greek legacy, cartography stressed the “scientific”, methodical, and measurable aspects of these representations, which the European tradition embraced, dismissing the other more subjective discourses; and referring to these non-European maps as “primitive". (see History of Cartography).

Ranging from paintings produced by the Aboriginal people of Australia (Indigenous Australians) to maps of the Indigenous peoples of the Americas (Native Americans), and from the Marshall Islands stick charts to the battle plans drawn on the ground by Māori warriors in New Zealand, they were widely regarded as an inchoate stage in the cognitive history of cartography. To the extent that they lacked orientation, regular scales, and the Euclidean geometry of modern maps, or were drawn on unfamiliar media, little effort was made to crack their codes of representation. They remained on the periphery of Western cartographic achievement. (Harley, 1991)

As cartography encompassed both the Western world and non-Western world expressions its definition expanded from just being cognitive structures to understand space to be a contextual historical discourse.

== Aztec Cartographic Histories ==
Post-conquest indigenous cartographic expressions were an example of the conscientious combination of the foreign and indigenous styles, an active reflection of the cultural changes taking place at that moment in Mesoamerica. The maps and the mapmaking that came from Europe to the New World during the conquest were “framed by a scientific rationale, primarily accentuating economic, social, and political boundaries and often ignoring levels of signs and abstractions deeply rooted in the cultural context and social order where a map is produced” (Botero, 2006). With this in mind Aztec maps were not just layouts of the empire, but actually cartographic histories. Not only those documented how things were arranged in space but they told stories and were a common method of presenting space and movement through it and Mexican historians made remarkable use of this technique (Boone, 2000). According to Elizabeth Hill Boone any story is tied to a protagonist (who), a date (when), and a location (where); and maps such as the MC2 allowed the representation of these three elements, therefore they were a suitable discourse for their stories.

== The MC2 and the Tolteca-Chichimeca history ==
Extracted from the MC2 and Paul Kirchhoff's work

The map, using an undoubtedly Mesoamerican cartographic discourse, though with minor European accents (for example in the detail of the facial expressions), describes a pilgrimage. A ritual (Boone, 2000) and cultural journey from the mythical cave of Chicomoztoc to the town of Cuauhtinchan in the heart of today's Valley of Puebla in the immediacies of the Amozoc-Tepeaca mountain range (Yoneda, 2005). It tells a story that spans about four hundred years, between the twelfth and sixteenth centuries (Reyes, 1977). The story told in this manuscript starts while the Olmeca-Xicallanca were attacking the city of Cholula, the Tolteca capital. The Tolteca rulers sent two lords/priests, Icxicouatl (“Serpent Foot”) and Quetzalteueyac (“Feather Lip”) (Kirchhoff et al., 1976; Wake, 2007) to find and hire the famous Chichimeca mercenaries, “son valientes hombres, animosos y esforzados soldados (tiyacuah)” (Kirchhoff et al., 1976) that lived in Chicomoztoc to fight for them (Reyes, 1977). The Chichimeca tribes left the sacred site led by Itzpapalotl, their goddess of war (Yoneda, 2002a), followed their Tolteca guides for thirteen days (Yoneda, 2002b), arrived to the city of Cholula, and defeated the Tolteca enemies, the Olmeca-Xicallanca. As reward for their services the Chichimeca-Cuauhtinchantlacas (the mapmakers' ancestors) were given the title of tecuhtli and allowed to settle in the immediacies of the mountain range of Amozoc-Tepeaca, where after surveying the valley they founded Cuauhtinchan (Reyes, 1977; Yoneda, 2005). Additionally, the Map tells the story of the tensions between Cuauhtinchantlacas and Popolocas, their claims to the lands of the altepetl of Cuauhtinchan, and their ultimate defeat by the Mixteca Lord 13, who pursued and killed Teuchtlecozauhqui (Kirchhoff et al., 1976). After this the Cuauhtinchantlaca survivors took refuge in Matlatzinco, south of Cuauhtinchan in the bank of the Atoyac River near the current town of Tzicatlacoyan (Kirchhoff et al., 1976).

=== Cave, City, and Eagle's Nest ===
From 2002 to 2007 research on this manuscript was conducted at Harvard University. The work was carried through the Moses Mesoamerican Archive in the Department of Anthropology and the David Rockefeller Center for Latin American Studies at Harvard University. The Mexican American historian of religions David Carrasco was responsible for organizing the five-year study at Harvard that resulted in Cave, City, and Eagle's Nest, edited by Carrasco and his former student and colleague Scott Sessions. For a useful history of this project see the introduction to the book written by the co-editors. Carrasco did a lecture tour about the MC2 Codex in 2008 and 2009.

== See also ==
Some interesting internal and external links to indigenous manuscripts and studies on these documents are:

=== Further reading ===
- Traditional knowledge gis
- Sinckan Manuscripts
- Aztec Codices
- Ramírez Codex
- Nahuatl orthography
