= Mesoamerican cosmovision =

Mesoamerican cosmovision or cosmology is the collection of worldviews shared by the Indigenous pre-Columbian societies of Mesoamerica. The cosmovision of these societies was reflected in the ways in which they were organized, such as in their built environment and social hierarchies, as well as in their epistemologies and ontologies, including an understanding of their place within the cosmos or universe. Elements of Mesoamerican cosmovision are reflected in pre-Columbian textual sources, such as the Popol Vuh and the Cuauhtinchan maps, the archeological record, as well as in the contemporary beliefs, values, and practices of Indigenous people, such as the Maya, Nahua, and Purépecha, as well as their descendants. It has been argued that the Day of the Dead (Spanish: Día de los Muertos) ceremony exists as a legacy of Mesoamerican cosmovision.

== Themes ==
=== Duality ===
The Mesoamerican understanding of the universe was guided by parallelisms, or dualities. In the Mesoamerican universe, everything formed a part of a pair. One of the most fundamental dualities was that of "macrocosmos", or the divine powers in the universe, and "microcosmos" or life on earth. Mesoamerican cosmovision linked space and time in a way that provided necessary structure to life.

=== Worldmaking, worldcentering, worldrenewing ===
The Mesoamerican world was made or structured to reflect their cosmovision. Societies were organized around huge, urban ceremonial centers, which were in turn constructed to reflect the cosmos through architecture, placement with relation to celestial bodies, and artwork. Mesoamericans, who viewed their landscape in terms of cardinal directions, saw these urban centers as axis mundi, places where divine power reaches the earth, and is diffused from there. These centers held ritual events that gave people access to “making” or generating a world that aligned with cosmovision. Its rulers and ancestors centered the Mesoamerican world. Ancestor worship, deification of rulers, and reverence for royal lineages were the foci in societies throughout Mesoamerica. Worldrenewing or rejuvenation was achieved through a variety of ritual practices, ceremonial sacrifice, and adherence to calendar systems. "Critical cosmovision can be summarised as a fusing of the cultural consciousness that continues ancestral knowledge and its practices, and a political consciousness that identifies and confronts systems of power..." Which integrates different perspective based on the indigenous people creating a sort of mentality that deeply rooted back to their roots which promised them success.

== Evidence ==
=== Textual primary sources ===
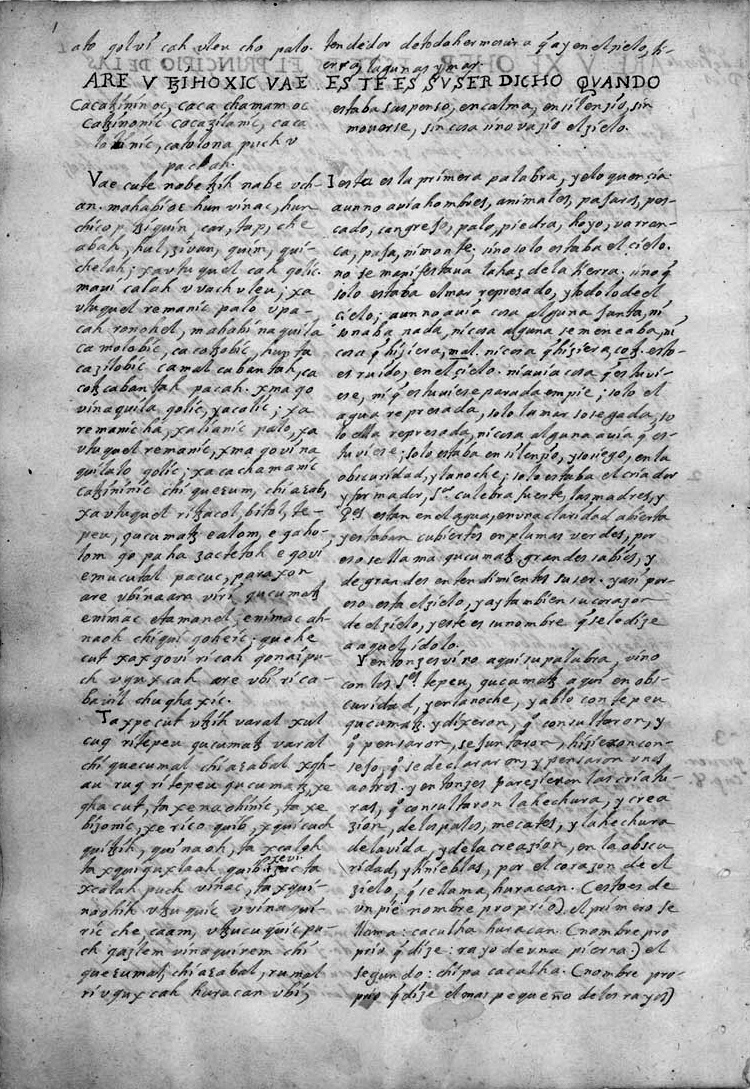
Title page of the Popol Vuh

Cosmovision is described extensively in the Popol Vuh, an ancient Mayan book, which describes the Mayan belief system concerning the creation of the world, the deities and their roles within the cosmos, as well as the importance of rulers. The survival of this text through translation, first as a hieroglyphic text and later as an alphabetic text, indicates that this book was paramount in preserving Mayan culture, which was inextricably linked to Mayan cosmovision. Throughout the Popol Vuh, the themes common to Mesoamerican cosmovision such as the concept of axis mundi, ritual sacrifice and ceremony, and duality and parallelism, are repeatedly presented. Cosmovision is depicted in the hero stories of Hunahpu and Xbalanque, One Hunahpu, and Seven Hunahpu, as well as the story concerning the conception of humans in the Popol Vuh.

=== Archaeological record ===
The importance of cosmovision as a long lasting and unifying theme in Mesoamerican culture is also evident throughout the archaeological record. According to Gordon Willey's theory concerning settlement patterns, excavated sites (considered primary sources) provide evidence for religious organization (Willey, 205). If one considers the major urban centers throughout Mesoamerica, such as Copan, Tikal, Teotihuacan, and Tenochtitlan to name a few, it is possible to discern very obvious, shared characteristics. These distinctive attributes include things such as architecture and celestial alignment that reflect Mesoamerican cosmovision. This is apparent in the building of massive pyramid sites, which represented the axis mundi in societies. They were places that embodied worldmaking, representing the creation beliefs, visually paralleling notions of the way in which the cosmos was organized. These urban sites also centered the Mesoamerican world by providing places where rulers could give people in society physical, and ultimately spiritual, access to their cosmovision. Finally, these urban centers provided a place for worldrenewal, where ritual ceremony and sacrifice took place.

=== Post-conquest sources ===
A final example, the 16th century Mapa de Cuauhtinchan, illustrates how powerful and enduring the Mesoamerican cosmovision was. According to Elizabeth Boone's interpretation of the Mapa de Cuauhtinchan, cosmovision influenced the culture of Mesoamericans so heavily during the Colonial Period that they used their origin story as justification to claim native lands. Ancestor worship is a common theme in Mesoamerican cosmovision. The northern, Nahuatl-speaking people all shared a common origin story, which is depicted in the Mapa de Cuauhtinchan. This map serves not only to center the Mesoamerican world through the stories of its ancestors and rulers, but also depicts urban centers, which reflect worldmaking. Finally, the Mapa de Cuauhtinchan also reveals ceremonial rituals, an essential component of worldrenewing. All of these themes are clearly important to native Mesoamericans right up through the Colonial Period.

== Effects of Spanish colonization ==
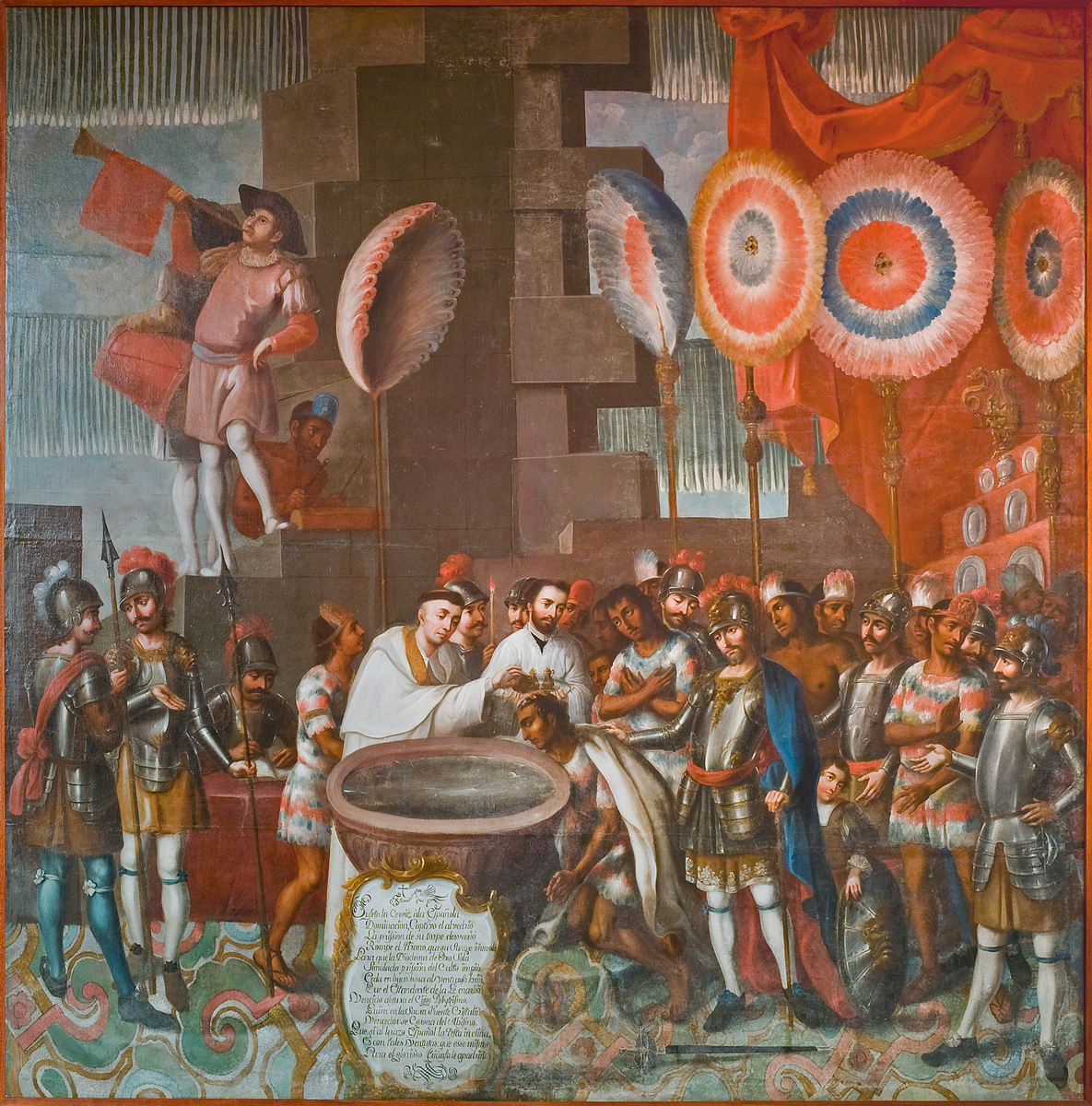
The baptism of Ixtlilxóchitl II by José Vivar y Valderrama, 18th century. Baptism was central in the process of conversion used by Spanish colonizers in their attempts to eliminate Indigenous cosmologies.

Existing internal familial disputes within rulers of the Aztec Triple Alliance were exploited by the Spanish conquistadors upon their arrival in 1519. Rulers such as Ixtlilxóchitl II of Texcoco allied with the Spanish conquistador Hernán Cortés, but by the early 1520s had come to realize "that his alliance with the Castilian intruders extended beyond the initial material exchanges, offers of wives and concubines, gifts of slaves, and payments of tribute. It also included religious demands that burrowed ever deeper into indigenous politics, society, and lives." Franciscan friars demanded that Ixtlilxóchitl II destroy Indigenous idols, desecrate deities, dismantle local priesthoods as well as send the children of local nobility to missionaries for instruction. In 1524, Ixtlilxóchitl II converted to Christianity and ordered his family to do the same. After his mother refused, he threatened to "burn her alive if she did not get baptized," which forced her compliance. The children Ixtlilxóchitl II had placed under the friars instruction "destroyed temples and drove the native priests out of their sacred grounds." Ixtlilxóchitl II continued to support the friars, who became central in the process of converting Texococoan commoners to Christianity.

By the 1520s and 1530s in Mesoamerica, millions of Indigenous people were being baptized, often collectively, while "makeshift churches began to appear atop temple ruins and young neophytes confiscated and desecrated images of local deities." This violent process of conversion was historically chronicled as "a sudden Christian triumph over an entrenched and bloodthirsty paganism" or a total conquest of mostly passive Indigenous peoples. This is exemplified in the idea of a "spiritual conquest" described scholar Robert Ricard in 1933. However, more recent historians have determined that Spanish conquest was coercive, yet "incomplete," with some scholars "tending to see Catholicism as a thin veneer covering a still pagan Indian people." Historian Ryan Dominic Crewe determines that "the expansion and acceleration of native baptisms was the product not solely of a spiritual encounter, or of a clash of melding mentalities, but was also part and parcel of struggles for power over native communities," considering that "the very natives who converted - or refused to do so - acted under duress, as well as the fact that conversion was fundamental to Spanish notions of legitimacy." As Crewe determines, "baptism acquired ever-greater relevance to indigenous efforts to stabilize a world that had been thrown into disorder." For Indigenous peoples in Mesoamerica, preserving and continuing to practice their beliefs reflected in their cosmologies was not openly possible in the wake of Spanish colonization.

Indigenous cosmologies were continually repressed through violence as the colonial period continued, which resulted in further Christianization of Indigenous peoples, who were conditioned to internalize shame and fear of their own worldviews. This was firstly undertaken in name of the Catholic Church and, post-Independence, by criollos, in the name of liberalism and scientific positivism.

== Contemporary manifestations ==
=== Day of the Dead ===
We see the three main themes of cosmovision (worldmaking, worldcentering, and worldrenewing) in the modern ceremony: of the Day of the Dead. This ceremony begins with great preparation. Special food and drinks are prepared. Decorations are made and collected. Once all is in order for the festivities, the altar is made ready. Altars are located in family homes, in churches, in town centers, and in graveyards. The altar is decorated and ofrenda (offerings) are laid on the altar for ancestors who will visit. Finally, the actual ceremony, during which the dead ancestors come together with living descendants, represents the concept of worldrenewing. Through this process, the Mesoamerican world is renewed.

=== Pilgrimages to the Virgin of Guadalupe ===
In Mexico, pilgrimages to the Basilica of Our Lady of Guadalupe in Mexico City are made "at the same place where the Aztecs worshiped the goddess Tonantzin 'our mother,' the goddess of fertility."

== Sources ==
- Boone, Elizabeth. “The House of the Eagle”, in Cave City and Eagle's Nest: an Interpretive Journey through the Mapa de Cuauhtinchan No. 2. Ed. David Carrasco & Scott Sessions. Albuquerque: University of New Mexico Press, 2007.
- Carrasco, David. Religions of Mesoamerica: cosmovision and ceremonial centers, 2nd edn. Long Grove, Ill.: Waveland Press, 2014.
- Castillo, Bernal Diaz del. The History of the Conquest of New Spain. Trans. David Carrasco. Albuquerque: University of New Mexico Press, 2009.
- Fash, William. Copan: The History of an Ancient Maya Kingdom. SAR Press, 2005.
- Fash, William, et al. “The House of New Fire at Teotihuacan and its Legacy in Mesoamerica”, in The Art of Urbanism: How Mesoamerican Kingdoms Represented Themselves in Architecture and Imagery. Ed. William L. Fash & Leonardo López Luján. Washington, D.C.: Dumbarton Oaks, 2012.
- Restall, Matthew & Kris Lane. Latin America in Colonial Times. Cambridge University Press, 2011.
- Tedlock, Dennis, trans. Popol Vuh: the Definitive Edition of the Mayan Book of the Dawn of Life and the Glories of Gods and Kings, with commentary based on the ancient knowledge of the modern Quiché Maya. NY: Simon & Schuster, 1996.
- Wheatley, Paul. City as a symbol: an inaugural lecture delivered at University College, London 20 November 1967. London: H. K. Lewis & Co. Ltd., 1967.
- Willey, Gordon. “Mesoamerican Civilization and the Idea of Transcendence.” Antiquity 50, 199 (1976): 205–15.
