= Cantona (archaeological site) =

Mesoamerican site in Puebla, Mexico

Coordinates: 19°33′7.41″N 97°29′16.14″W

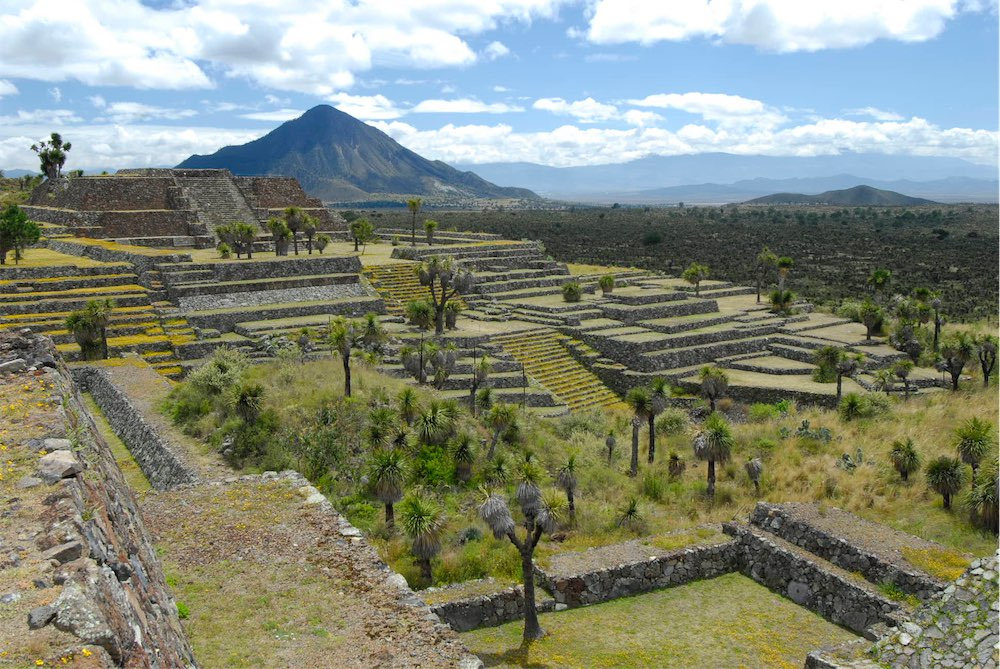
Part of the archaeological zone of Cantona

Cantona (La casa del sol) is a Mesoamerican archaeological site in Mexico. It is located between 2,450 and 2,600 meters above sea level in the state of Puebla, on the border with the state of Veracruz. The site lies about an hour's drive from the city of Puebla and about an hour and a half from Xalapa, Veracruz. Limited archaeological work has been done at the site. It is estimated that only one to 10% of the site can be seen.

At its peak, Cantona was a walled, fortified city with a high level of urbanization. Its original inhabitants are unknown, but it is speculated that it was inhabited by Olmeca-Xicallanca groups towards the late Classical Period.

Cantona sat astride an old trading route between the Gulf Coast and the Central Highlands and was a prominent, if isolated, Mesoamerican city between 600 and 1000 C.E. It was abandoned after 1050 C.E.

Its maximum apogee is placed at the epiclassical Mesoamerica period, that is, the period during which Teotihuacan ceased to be the main power center in the region and small regional states sought to gain control of the various trade routes. Cantona was one of these regional centers, and controlled Sierra Madre Oriental resources.

The Pre-Columbian settlement area occupies approximately 12 km^{2}, distributed in three units, of which the largest is at the south, with an area of five km^{2}. In Cantona 24 ballgame courts have been discovered, more than in any other mesoamerican site, as well as a series of small pyramids. The Zaragoza obsidian mine is located nearby. It has an elevated Acropolis over the rest of the city in which the main buildings of the city were built. This was used for the ruling elite and priests, and was where the temples of the most important deities where located.

The site comprises a road network with over 500 cobblestone causeways, more than 3,000 individual patios, residences, 24 ballcourts and an elaborate acropolis with multiple ceremonial buildings and temples.

These impressive buildings were constructed with carved stones (one atop the other) without any Stucco or cement mortar. Its population is estimated at 80,000 inhabitants at its peak. It is believed that trade was an important activity. It certainly was built with a definite urban design and walkways connecting each and every part of the city. The "First Avenue" is 563 meters in length. Cantona was contemporary of Teotihuacan.

Its inhabitants were mainly agricultural farmers and traders, particularly for obsidian, obtained from Oyameles-Zaragoza mountains surrounding the city. Additionally, they may have been supplying the lowlands with a derivative of the maguey plant, pulque. After Chichimec's invasions in the 11th century, Cantona was abandoned.

So far, 24 ballgame courts have been found in Cantona, a quantity that symbolizes the power maintained over other peoples by managing the largest ceremonial center of their time, where the losers in the game were slaughtered, a source of pride for the people.

== Site history ==
Henri de Saussure claimed to have discovered Cantona in 1855 after a lengthy and prolonged search, Nicolás León, based on a Saussure publication, visited the zone in the early 1900s and explored the site, he left a full and comprehensive description of structures and surface objects at that time. Cantona is derived from the Nahuatl word Caltonal which means "House of the Sun".

In 1938, Paul Gendrop mentions that Cantona occupies an area of almost 20 km long by 12 kilometers wide. As for the site's architectonic elements distribution, he noted that it is formed by numerous rectangular rooms 20 to 30 meters long by 12 to 20 meters wide, delimited by thick stone walls, fairly straight and well preserved.

Eduardo Noguera, in 1958, after a tentative study of ceramics and constructive systems, noted that Cantona occupies only half the size of what was previously calculated by Paul Gendrop and locates it, chronologically in the preclassical horizon (200 to 100 B.C.E.), coinciding with data available then.

In 1980 archaeologist Diana Lopez de Molina, based on aerial photographs, made a sketch of the settlement and dug some stratigraphic wells that allowed her to propose a tentative timeline to the occupation of the area. Previous studies allow the assumption that this prehispanic city was occupied from the late preclassical horizon (200 B.C.E.) to the early classic (0 to 200 C.E.), which makes it one of the oldest cities of the country.

According to investigation, Cantona would be chronologically situated between 600 and 1000 C.E.; its splendor coincides with the fall of the main cities of the classical horizon (it is even thought it had something to do with the Teotihuacan fall, by obstructing passage of products from the coast to the Highlands) and with the arrival of warrior people who soon seized and dominated the region.

== The site ==
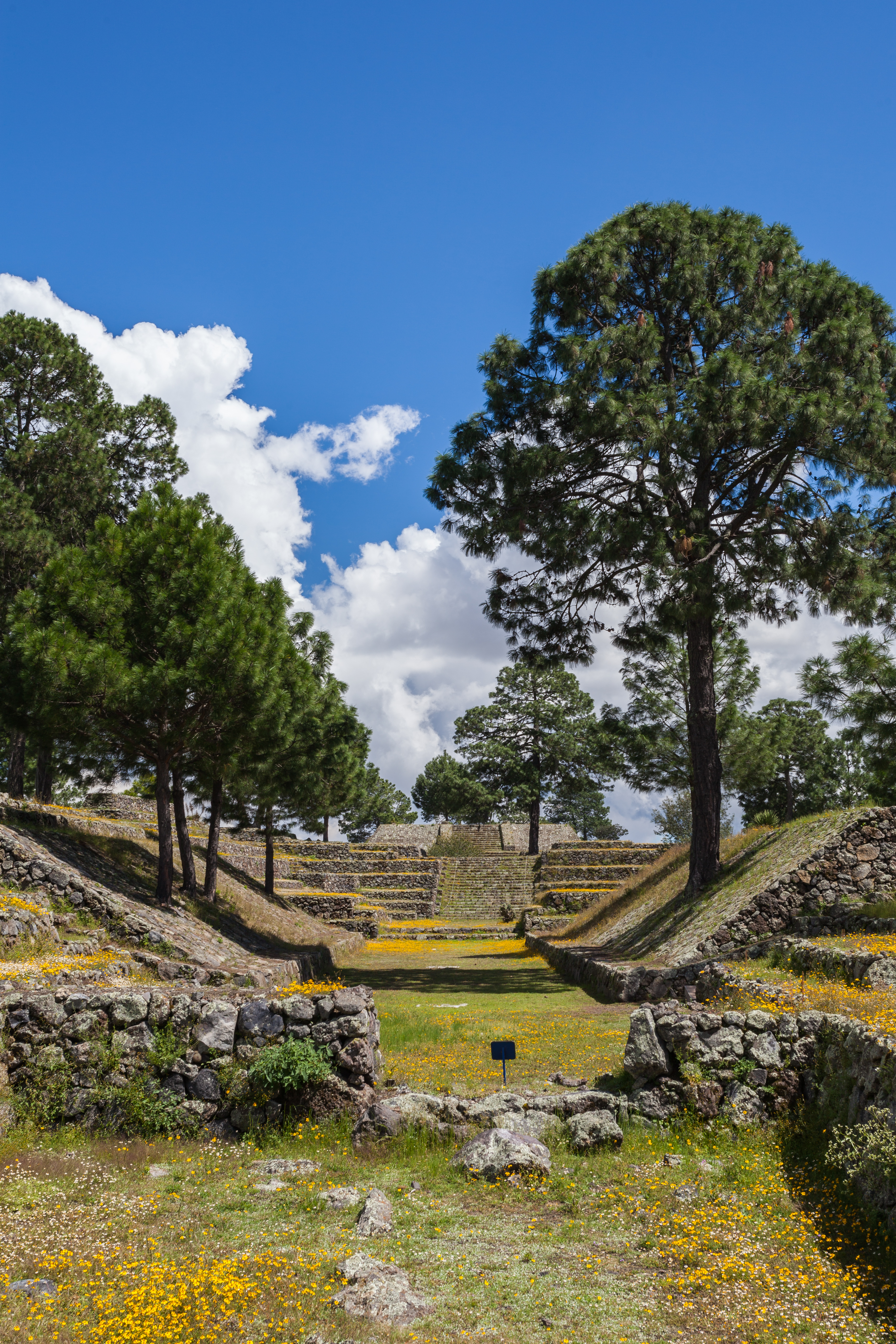
One of the ballcourts at the site.

The site covers about 12 square kilometers. For study purposes it was divided into three large units. The southern part is the best preserved part. The Acropolis (area where the main structures are located, believed to be the shelter of political, economic and religious powers), is a good example of the settlement.

The site is made up by many patios of approximately 50 x 40 meters, or even larger; in some of them obsidian and stone workshops (stone tools) were found, hence a clear division and specialization of its inhabitants work is deduced. According to García Cook, rural people settled in low lands, leaving people with social rank the intermediate areas and, finally, at the top were temples, ballgames, and the houses of chiefs and leaders. Evidence indicate that the patios were residential places for Cantona family groups; such is the amount, that in sector V, 620 patios were detected and 997 mounds, including housing units, altars and pyramids.

Its architecture is absent of stucco as decoration element, although mud was possibly used to join volcanic rock in addition to the technique of placing stone on stone, as was done to shape walls, alleys, platforms and other archaeological structures. There are two large prehispanic roads; these avenues are framed by high and thick volcanic stone walls, (some of them more than a kilometer long) that together with the streets and roads allowed access to the patios and ceremonial areas, constituting an important access control to the city and internal urban areas; this great fortress also had a moat that protected the city on its limits with the Valley, from possible invasions from this sector.

In the highest areas are located ceremonial nature structures as ballgame courts (over 24) 12 of them have a special distribution which has been termed Cantona type, because it has integrated architectural complexes in which generally are a pyramid, one or two plazas, an altar, and several peripheral structures; there is uneven symmetry on its walls, there are discrepancies in orientation or measures. Recent studies indicate that Cantona was besieged by foreign groups, which together with strong climate change, ended up affecting the city, leading to its abandonment.

The construction system and size included in its three units, has been considered the most urbanized city known so far in the central Mexican Plateau. Its size is surprising, its roads and stone walls, by its patios and ballgame courts, but more surprising of all is to learn that, all visited in the site (3 km), and the structures available comprise only 10% of the total of this prehispanic city.

It is assumed that water in this area was scarce, but did not limit construction of towering pyramids, housing spaces and narrow streets to maintain order in the different social standards that existed at that time, only two people can walk on the streets at the time because of narrow streets, in addition to street side walls for better control. The Earth Fertility Plaza is one of the most popular visits, because of phallic sculptures found, the two votive axes and all other material found, and is considered one of the most important findings. Cantona began declining as of 950 and 1000 and by 1100 was completely abandoned, without any current definition as to the reason why settlers migrated, although it was a prosperous and superbly constructed site.

== Chronology ==
The history of Cantona is divided into several different phases of development spanning approximately 2,000 years, from around 1000 B.C.E. until the city was finally abandoned around 1050 C.E.

Pre-Cantona (1,000/900 B.C.E. – 600 B.C.E.) The first settlers began to occupy this area which would later form a vast city. Pottery shards from the pre-Cantona period tell us that the early settlers came from the Poblano-Tlaxcalteca Valley and the Tehuacan Valley, and later from the Gulf of Mexico and the East. At this time Cantona consisted of a few sparse settlements with no fortification or defined plan. Between 900 and 750 C.E., two villas occupied the center and southern portion of the area where the city would later develop, and one or two villages existed to the North or Northeast. Little is known about the architecture of this phase, although the city had not yet developed complex fortifications, walls or streets that would characterize later stages of development. Cantona began exploiting and trading in obsidian obtained from the nearby Zaragoza-Oyameles Mountains of northeastern Puebla. Obsidian was a valuable resource used for weapons, tools, and artifacts to conduct ritual auto-sacrfice. The Zaragoza-Oyameles obsidian source would ultimately turn Cantona into one of the largest and most prosperous cities in prehispanic Mesoamerica.

In the late pre-Cantona period, between 750 – 600 C.E., the city began to develop joined housing, some streets in its interior, as well as paths to connect with other settlements.

Cantona I (600 B.C.E. – 50 C.E.) Fueled by mining local obsidian, Cantona entered a phase of rapid urban development with the city reaching a size of approximately 822 acres. The city began developing defensive systems and more complex internal traffic circulation, and raised platforms constructed of pieces of volcanic rock supporting thatched houses. Silos were built to store grain; these silos were strategically located to ensure control by the city elite. In addition to family workshops, areas were specially designated for specialized, state-controlled workshops. Ceremonial centers began to develop as rectangular plazas with pyramids. By the end of this phase, the city had built sixteen ballcourts, six of which were aligned with ceremonial plazas, altars, and pyramids. This phase also shows evidence of large-scale commercial trade with southern and southeastern Mexico.

Cantona II (50 C.E. – 600 C.E.) This period saw a flurry of construction activity correlated with increased social complexity. This is considered to have been the first major cultural peak in Cantona's history. Cantona now covered 2,718 acres and by 150 – 200 C.E. contained twenty ballcourts, half of which were aligned with ceremonial centers. By 400 C.E., the city had a population of 64,000.

Cantona III (600 C.E. – 900/950 C.E.) This was a period of significant change in governmental leadership, as the priest class was supplanted by military authority. While religious rituals did not disappear, the city ceased producing ceramic effigies of gods and stone sculpture.

Cantona IV (900/950 C.E. – 1000/1050 C.E.) This final period is primarily characterized by a rapid depopulation of the city. Cantona's population was reduced to no more than three to five thousand individuals, before disappearing completely.

== About the name ==
There are many studies and investigations, by multiple entities, it has been established that the ancient city was developed the Olmec or Chichimec culture, but the only safe conclusion reached so far is that a lot of investigation remains, because only 1% of the total of this archaeological area was investigated and the remaining 99% is still under the grass, trees, soil and rocks.

The discrepancy about the origins of this place starts with the name, because while officially known as Cantona, for San Pedro Tepeyahualco native inhabitants the real name is Caltona.
