= Chicomoztoc =

Nahuas mythical origin place

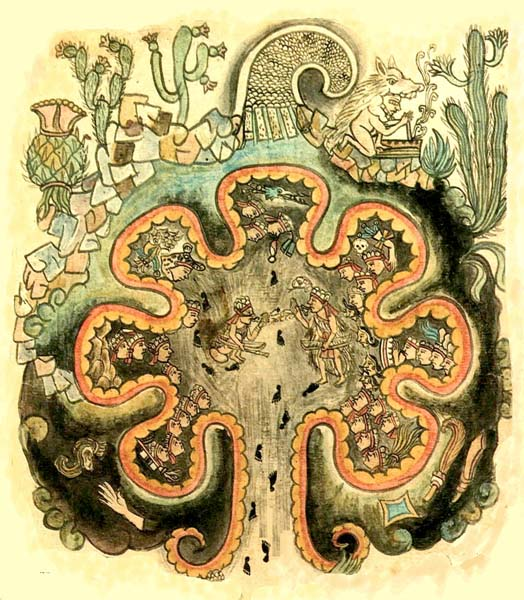
The seven caves of Chicomoztoc, from Historia Tolteca-Chichimeca. The depiction of a 'curved mountain' at the top of this painting is meant as a referent to Culhuacan.

Chicōmōztōc ([t͡ʃikoːˈmoːs̻toːk]) is the name for the mythical origin place of the Aztec Mexicas, Tepanecs, Acolhuas, and other Nahuatl-speaking peoples (or Nahuas) of Mesoamerica, in the Postclassic period.

The term Chicomoztoc derives from Nahuatl chicome (“seven”), oztotl (“cave”), and -c (“place”). In symbolic terms these caves within a hill have been compared to the wombs from which the various peoples were born; another possible association is with the seven orifices of the human body. In either case, this term is associated with the origin, birth, or beginning of a group of people, both mythic and historical.

There is an association of Chicomoztoc with certain legendary traditions concerning Culhuacan (Colhuacan), an actual pre-Columbian settlement in the Valley of Mexico which was considered to have been one of the earliest and most pre-eminent settlements in the valley. Culhuacan ("place of those with ancestors" is its literal meaning in Classical Nahuatl) was viewed as a prestigious and revered place by the Aztec/Mexica (who also styled themselves 'Culhua-Mexica'). In Aztec codical writing, the symbol or glyph representing the toponym of Culhuacan took the form of a 'bent' or 'curved' hill (a play on the homonym col- in Nahuatl, meaning "bent, twisted", e.g. as if by old age).

Some researchers have attempted to identify Chicomoztoc with a specific geographic location, likely between 60 and 180 miles northeast of the Valley of Mexico including perhaps a height near the present-day town of San Isidro Culhuacan. The purported existence of actual caves plays a role in New Age Mayanism.

== In other sources ==
In the Historia Tolteca-Chichimeca and the Mapa de Cuauhtinchan No. 2, Chicomoztoc was inhabited by seven different tribes: the Cuauhtinchantlaca, Totomiuaque, Acolchichimeca, Tzauhcteca, Zacateca, Malpantlaca and Texcalteca. In Chicomoztoc, they fasted and performed bloodletting rituals for four days. After performing a New Fire ceremony, these tribes went on to settle in the valley of Puebla.

== Cerro Culiacán ==
In the State of Guanajuato the highest mountain is "El Cerro de Culiacán" and is surrounded by all the signs that correspond to the measure and chronicles of the legendary Chicomoztoc.

== In fiction ==
In Clive Cussler's novel Lost Empire, Chicomoztoc is discovered to be an island in South Sulawesi, Indonesia, from where the ancestors of the Aztec were exiled sometime in the 6th century.

== See also ==
- Shamanism
- Aztlán – Legendary ancestral home of the Aztec
