= Historia Tolteca-Chichimeca =

16th-century Nahuatl-language manuscript

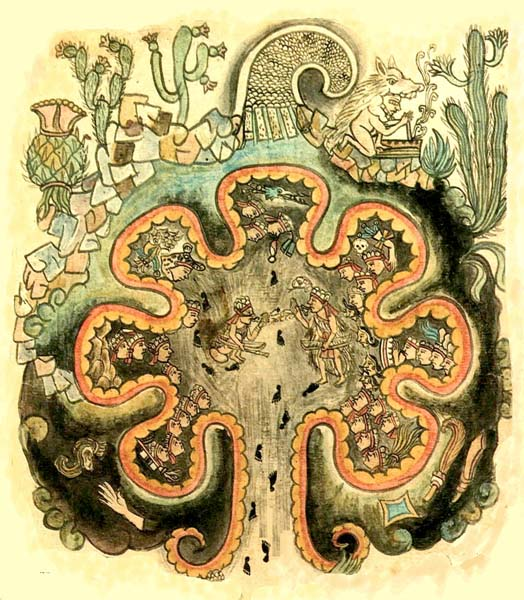
Chicomoztoc as depicted in the Historia Tolteca-Chichimeca.

The Historia Tolteca-Chichimeca is a 16th-century Nahuatl-language manuscript, dealing with the history of Cuauhtinchan. It is now in the Bibliothèque nationale in Paris.

The text describes the history of the Toltecs and the Chichimecas from before the Chichimecan migration until 1544.

It was written on European paper between 1547 and 1560. In 1976 Kirchhoff, Lina Odena Güemes y Luis Reyes García published a complete list of photographies of the book, accompanied by translation and interpretation. It was not written by Fernando De Alva Ixtlilxóchitl, who wrote the similarly titled Historia de la nación chichimeca.
