= Cuautinchán =

- Municipality and town
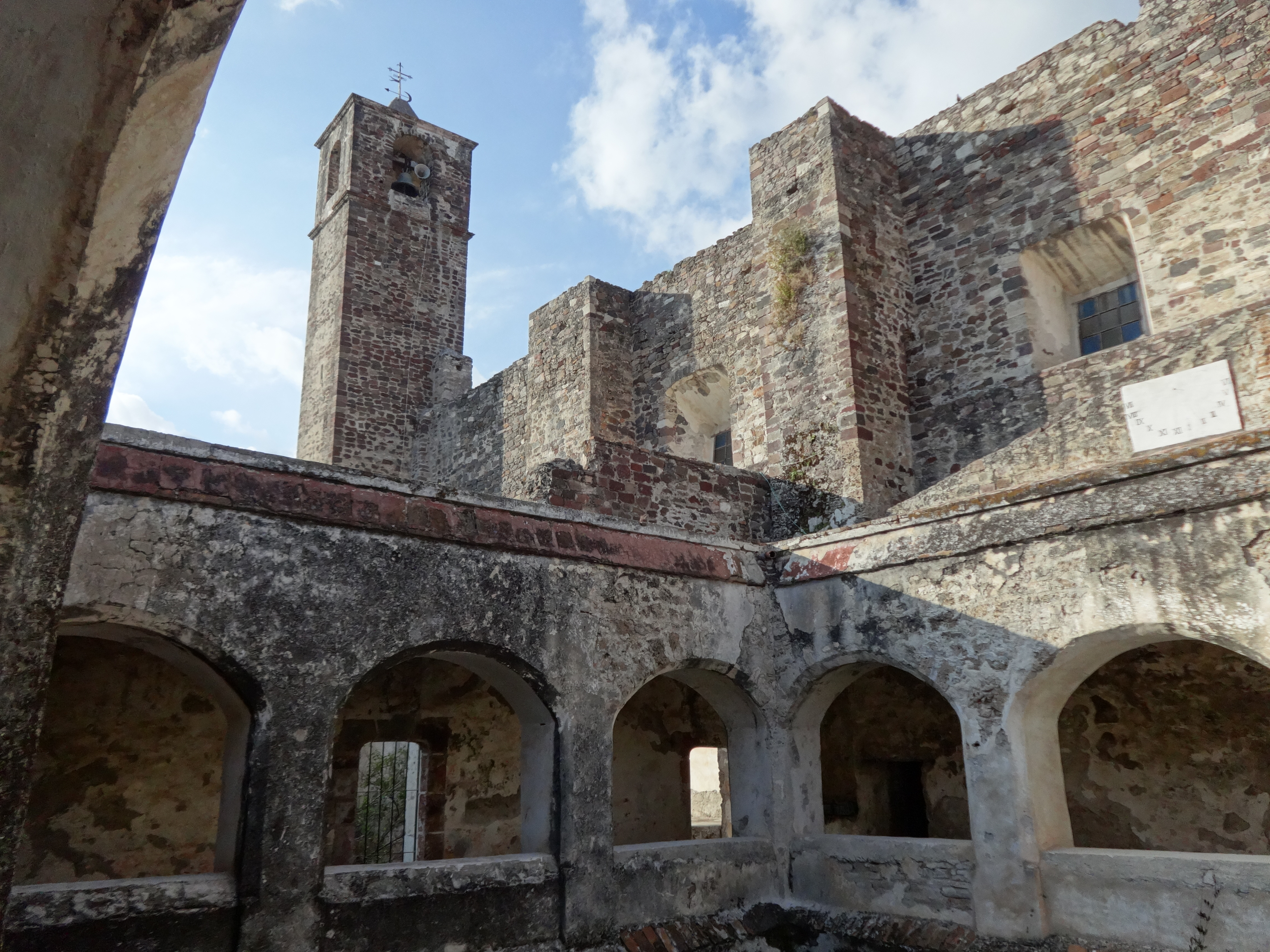

- Coat of arms

- Location of the municipality in Puebla

- Location in Mexico
- Coordinates: 18°57′20″N 98°0′59″W
- Country: Mexico
- State: Puebla

Area
  - Total: 136.50 km^{2} (52.70 sq mi)

Population (2010)
  - Total: 9,538
- Time zone: UTC-6 (Zona Centro)

Cuautinchán is a town and municipality in the Mexican state of Puebla. The municipality covers an area of 136.50 km^{2}. As of 2010, the municipality had a population of 9,538. It is located northeast of Alpatlahuac and northwest of Tecali de Herrera and roughly 20 kilometers southeast of Puebla city.

== See also ==
- Mapa de Cuauhtinchan No. 2
