= Puebla–Tlaxcala Valley =

The Puebla-Tlaxcala Valley is a valley located in the Trans-Mexican Volcanic Belt. It lies within the Mexican states of Puebla and Tlaxcala. It contains a large part of the Metropolitan area of Puebla, the country’s fourth-largest urban agglomeration in terms of population and economic activity.

It is bordered to the north by the so-called Tlaxcala Block and La Malinche volcano; to the west by the volcanoes Popocatépetl and Iztaccíhuatl, as well as the Nealtican badlands; to the southwest by the valleys of Atlixco and Matamoros; to the southeast by the Mixteca region of Puebla; and to the east by the Serdán Valley.

== History ==
In pre-Hispanic Mexico, the area where the city of Puebla is now located was called Cuetlaxcoapan, from Nahuatl place where snakes shed their skin. In present-day regional classifications, it is also called the “Tlaxcala-Puebla Valley” in Tlaxcala and the “Angelópolis Region” in Puebla.

== Current ==
The parts of the valley that have not been urbanised are used mainly for agriculture. Only a few remnants of the original pine–oak forest remain on hills and in ravines. The rest has been replaced by agricultural plants, particularly the milpa system; ornamental plants such as ficus trees, jacarandas and palm trees; and trees planted as windbreaks between cultivated fields, especially Peruvian pepper trees, eucalyptus trees and willows.

== See also ==
- Tlaxcaltec
- Puebla
- Río Frío de Juárez
