= Statue of Alfredo Toxqui Fernández de Lara =

Statue in Cholula, Puebla, Mexico

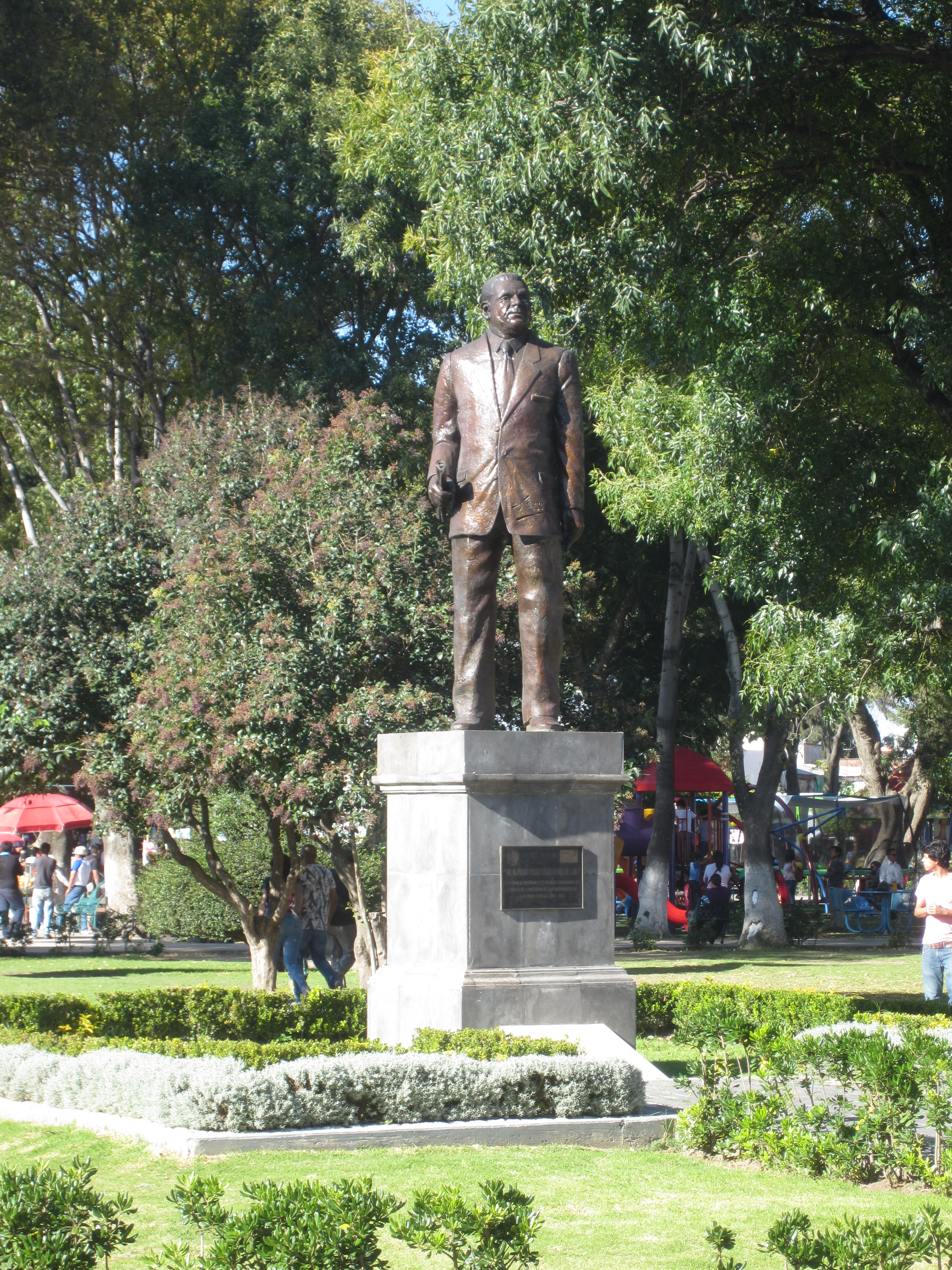
- The statue in 2018
- Location: Cholula, Puebla, Mexico; 19°3′41.3″N 98°18′20.5″W

The statue of Alfredo Toxqui Fernández de Lara in Cholula, Puebla, was erected by Gobierno Municipal de Cholula de Rivadavia in 2004.
