= Bust of Bernardino Rivadavia =

Sculpture in Cholula, Puebla, Mexico

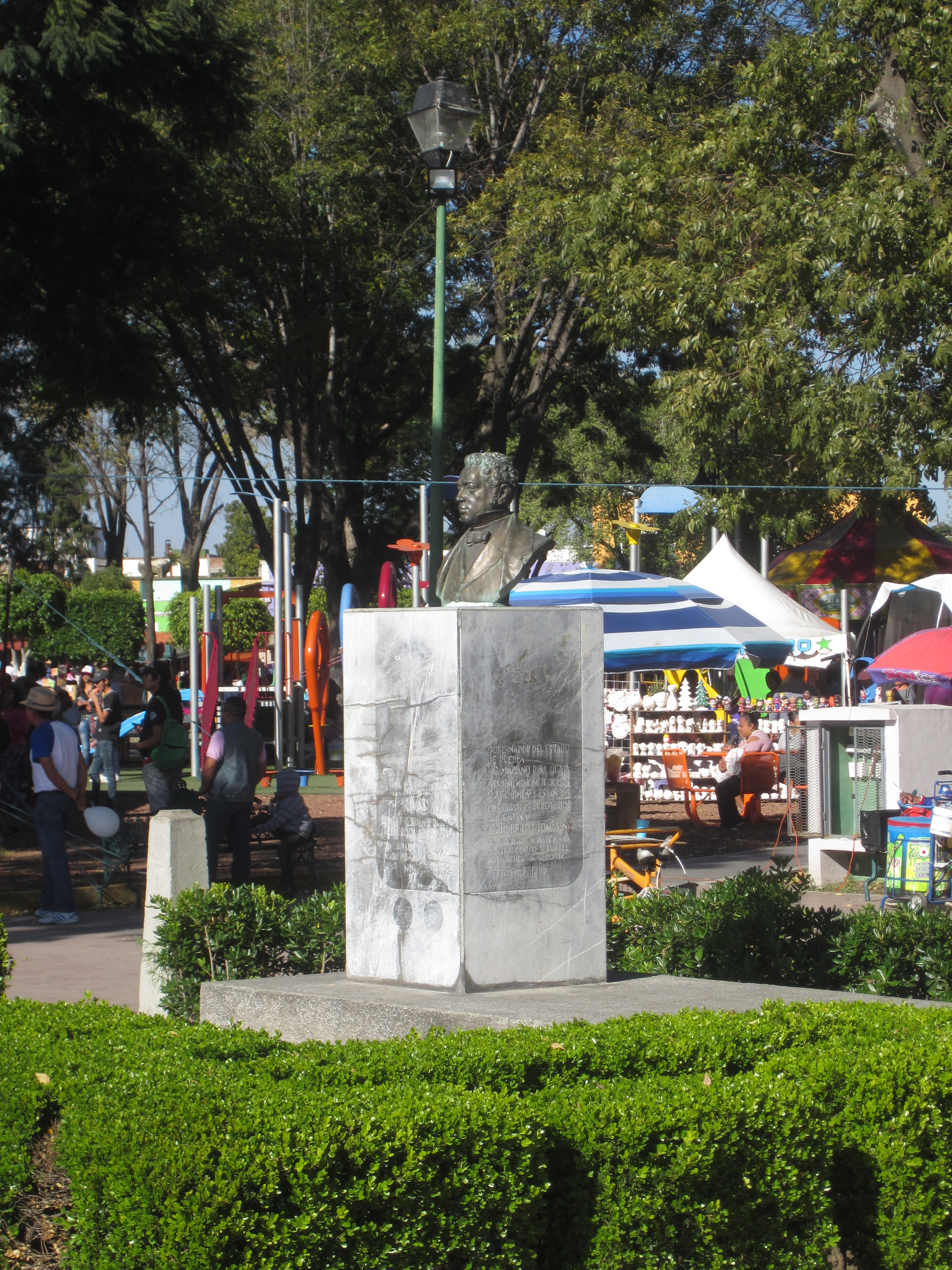
- The bust in 2018
- Subject: Bernardino Rivadavia
- Location: Cholula, Puebla, Mexico; 19°3′42.5″N 98°18′21.2″W

The bust of Bernardino Rivadavia is installed in Cholula, Puebla, Mexico.
