= Church of Santa María Tonantzintla =

Church in Cholula, Puebla, Mexico

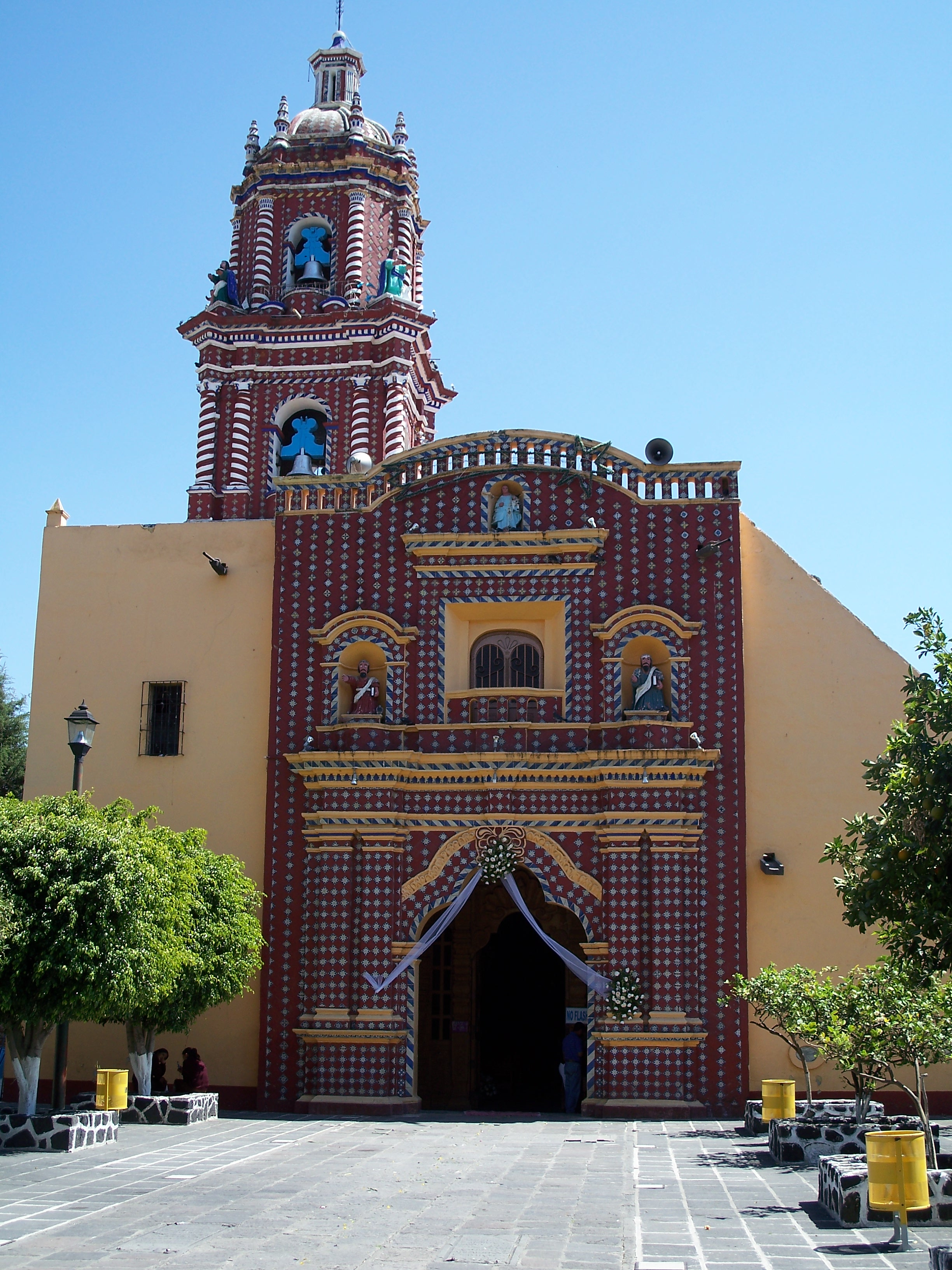
- The church's exterior

- Location within Mexico

Location
- Interactive map of Church of Santa María Tonantzintla
- Coordinates: 19°1′47.5″N 98°19′11″W

Santa María Tonantzintla (Spanish: Templo de Santa María Tonantzintla) is a church in Cholula, Puebla, Mexico.

== Description and history ==
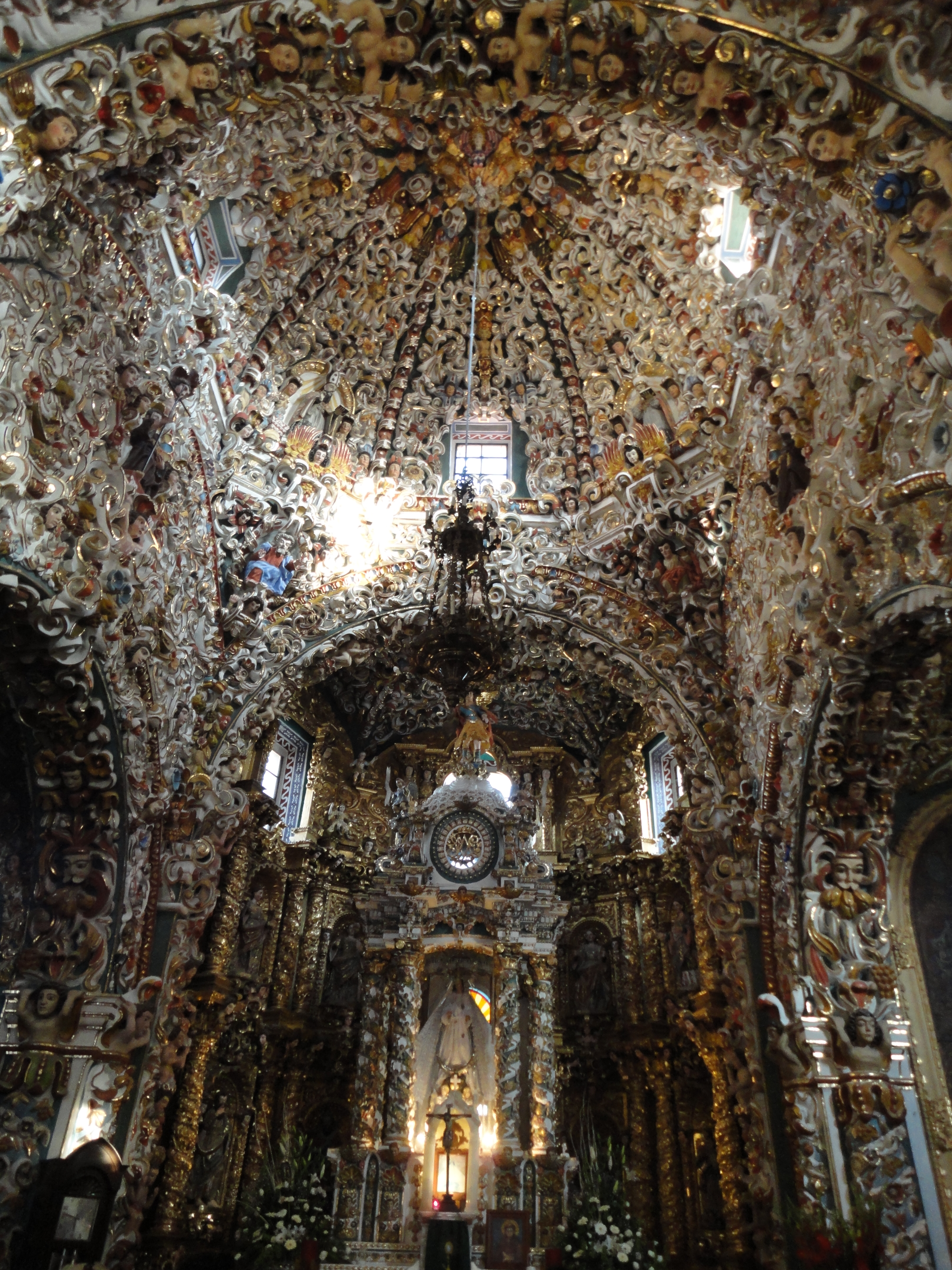
Interior, 2010

The church is valued for its decoration in what is called folk or indigenous Baroque. The church was initially built in the 16th century and developed over four phases until the 19th century. At the end of the 17th century, it had its basic layout, cupola, sacristy and main altar. At this time its intricate stucco work was begun. The first phase of construction began in the 16th century, with a small sanctuary, whose vestiges are located just north of the current church. The first church on this spot was built in the middle of the 16th century with a simple nave and façade, now destroyed. The second phase began at the end of the 17th century and beginning of the 18th, when the bell tower, cupola, basic layout and a small sacristy were built. Decorative stucco work was also done on the apse. The third phase covers most of the 18th century when the structure was completed, expanding the nave, leaving the tower within it, and a new façade. The last phase covers the 19th and early 20th centuries, when the final details were finished. These details include pre-Hispanic elements such as dark skinned angels, others with blond hair and blue eyes, niches with headdresses, tropical fruits and ears of corn. This area was sacred to Tonantzin, the mother goddess, and the Spanish replaced her with an image of the Virgin Mary.

In 1951 modern dancer and choreographer José Limón created a dance titled "Tonantzintla" based on the decoration in the nave of the church. The U.S. premiere of the work took place at Jacob's Pillow.
