= Iglesia de Nuestra Señora de los Remedios, Cholula =

Iglesia de Nuestra Señora de los Remedios
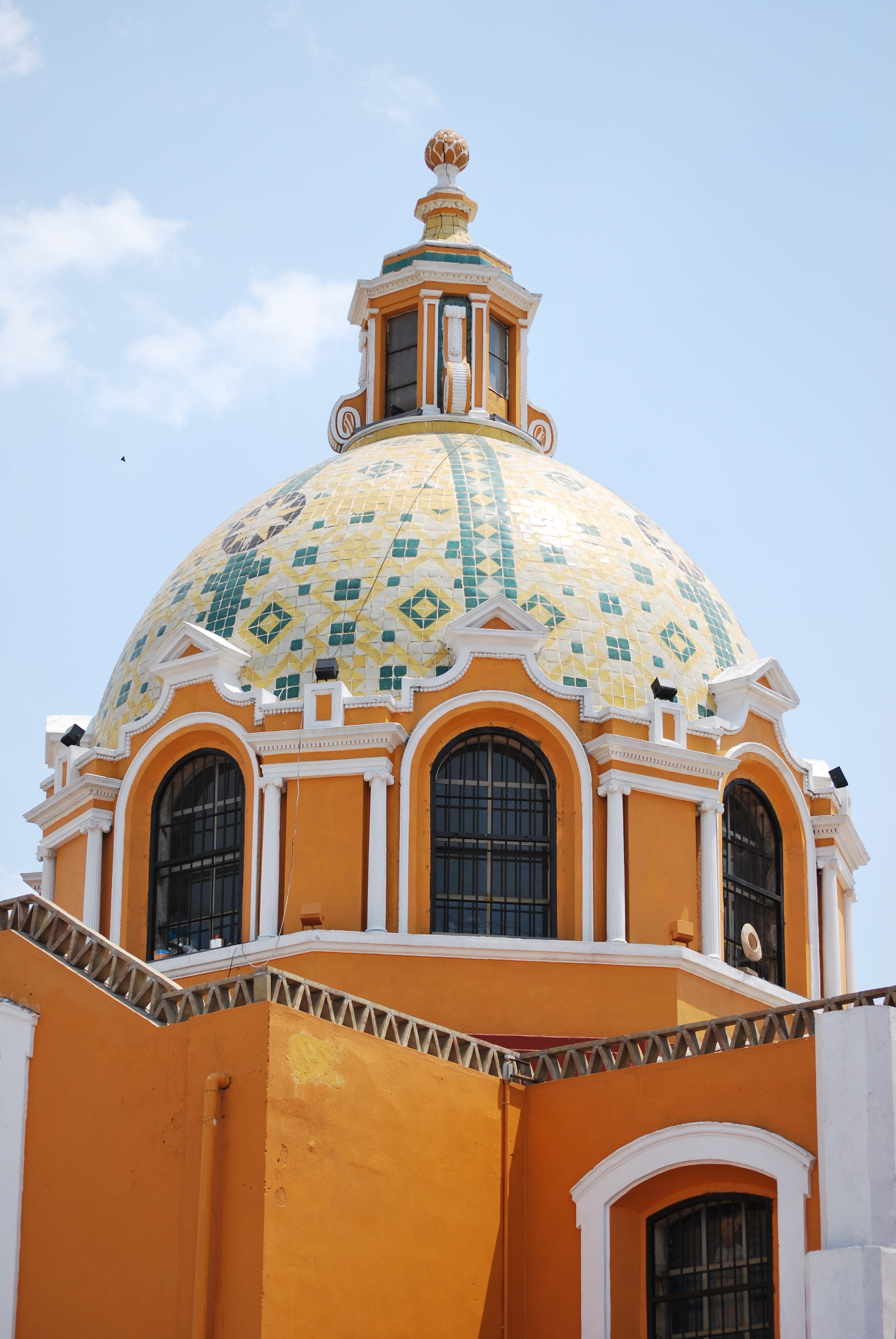
- One of the two domes of Nuestra Señora de los Remedios in Cholula, Puebla, Mexico.

- Location within Mexico
- 19.0581°N 98.3018°W
- Location: Cholula
- Country: Mexico
- Denomination: Roman Catholic

History
- Founded: 16th century
- Dedication: Virgin of Los Remedios
- Consecrated: March 25, 1629

Architecture
- Years built: May 1574 to August 1575

The Iglesia de Nuestra Señora de los Remedios (Our Lady of Remedies Church) is a 16th-century Mexican Catholic parish church built atop the Tlachihualtepetl pyramid in the municipality of Cholula located in the central Mexican state of Puebla. The church was built with carved stone and embellished with 24-carat gilded panels and shims, called laminilla. It has an altar in the neoclassical style. It was built between May 1574 and August 1575 and consecrated on March 25, 1629. The base on which the church is built is one of the largest pyramids of the ancient world, being 54 metres (177 ft) high, covering 54 acres and shaped by several superimposed structures over the course of six centuries.

== History ==
The defeat suffered by Hernán Cortés in the battle of the Noche Triste led to a hurried escape of the survivors up to Naucalpan. Along the way they suffered the loss of many soldiers and native allies as well as notable hostages, such as some children of Moctezuma.

The Spanish sheltered and recovered in the Indian temples until they could turn to fight the Aztecs at the Battle of Otumba. Legend tells that one of Cortés's soldiers, Gonzalo Rodriguez de Villafuerte, had with him one of the little religious images known as castrenses, and he hid it among the aloe plants in order to carry out a devotional action of thankfulness.

The legend tells that during the battle, a young girl threw dirt in the eyes of the attacking natives helping to seal the Spanish victory.

== Archeological structure ==
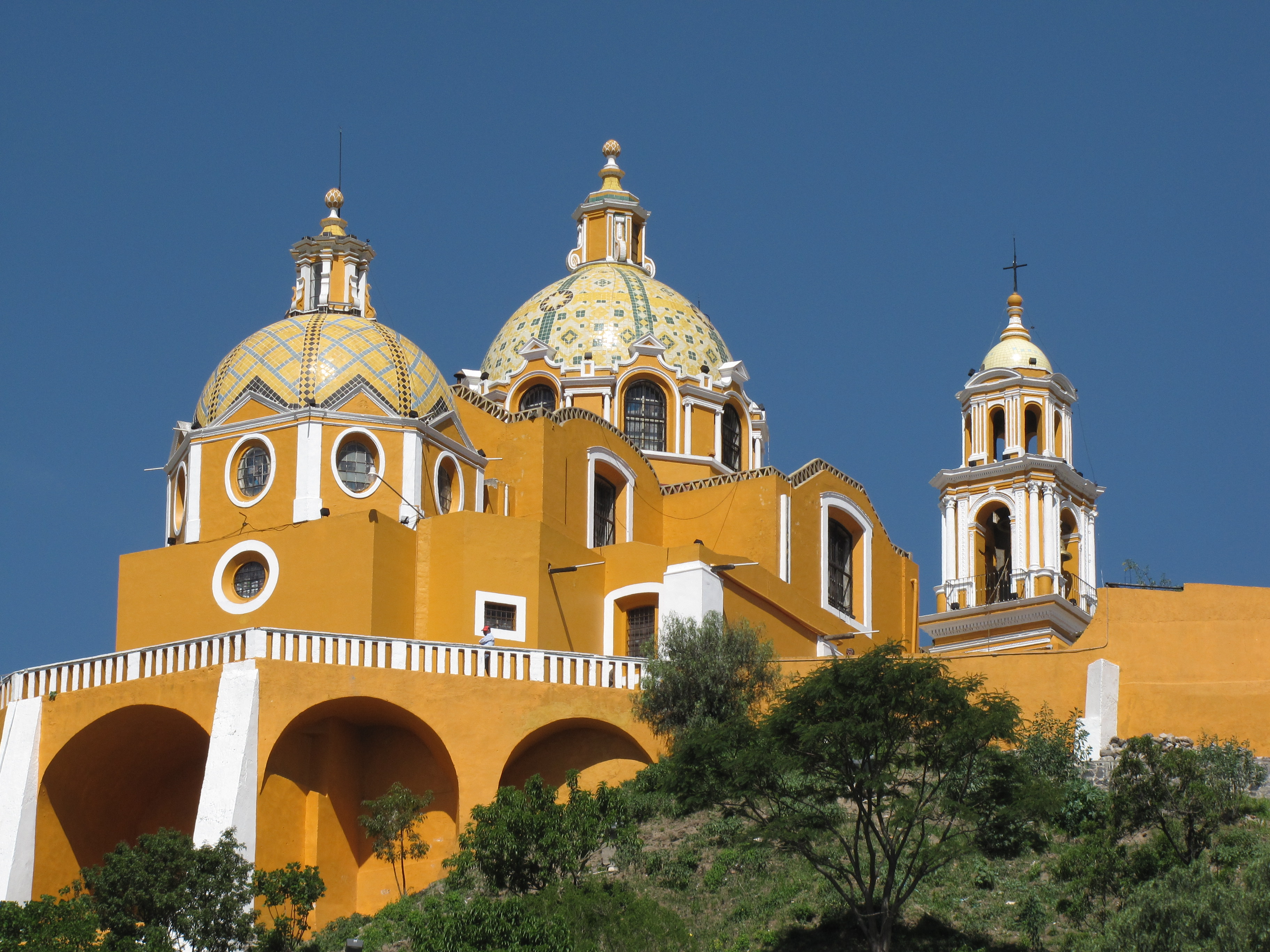
The back facade of Nuestra Señora de los Remedios in Cholula, Puebla, Mexico.

Recognizing the significance of the pyramid mound, the Spanish chose to construct a church upon the remains of the native temple grounds. The church is situated atop the Tlachihualtepetl (Grand Pyramid). Its worship, like that of its pre-Hispanic native predecessors, is associated with the propitiation of the rain.

This archeological structure consists of several superimposed pyramids, accumulated over six centuries. The base is 450 m (1,480 ft) on each side and 54 m (177 ft) high, twice as large as that of the Pyramid of the Sun in Teotihuacan and four times bigger in volume than that of Keops in Egypt.

In the early 1930s, knowledge about the Great Pyramid was scarce. Exploration began in 1931 under the direction of the architect Ignacio Marquina. After 25 years, eight kilometers of tunnels had been excavated, enabling the discovery of the seven superimposed pyramids. (In the second one the Mural of the Butterflies was discovered, and in an attached building they found the Mural of the Drinkers, depicting more than a hundred human figures in a ceremony in honor of Octli, the god of pulque.)

== Decoration ==
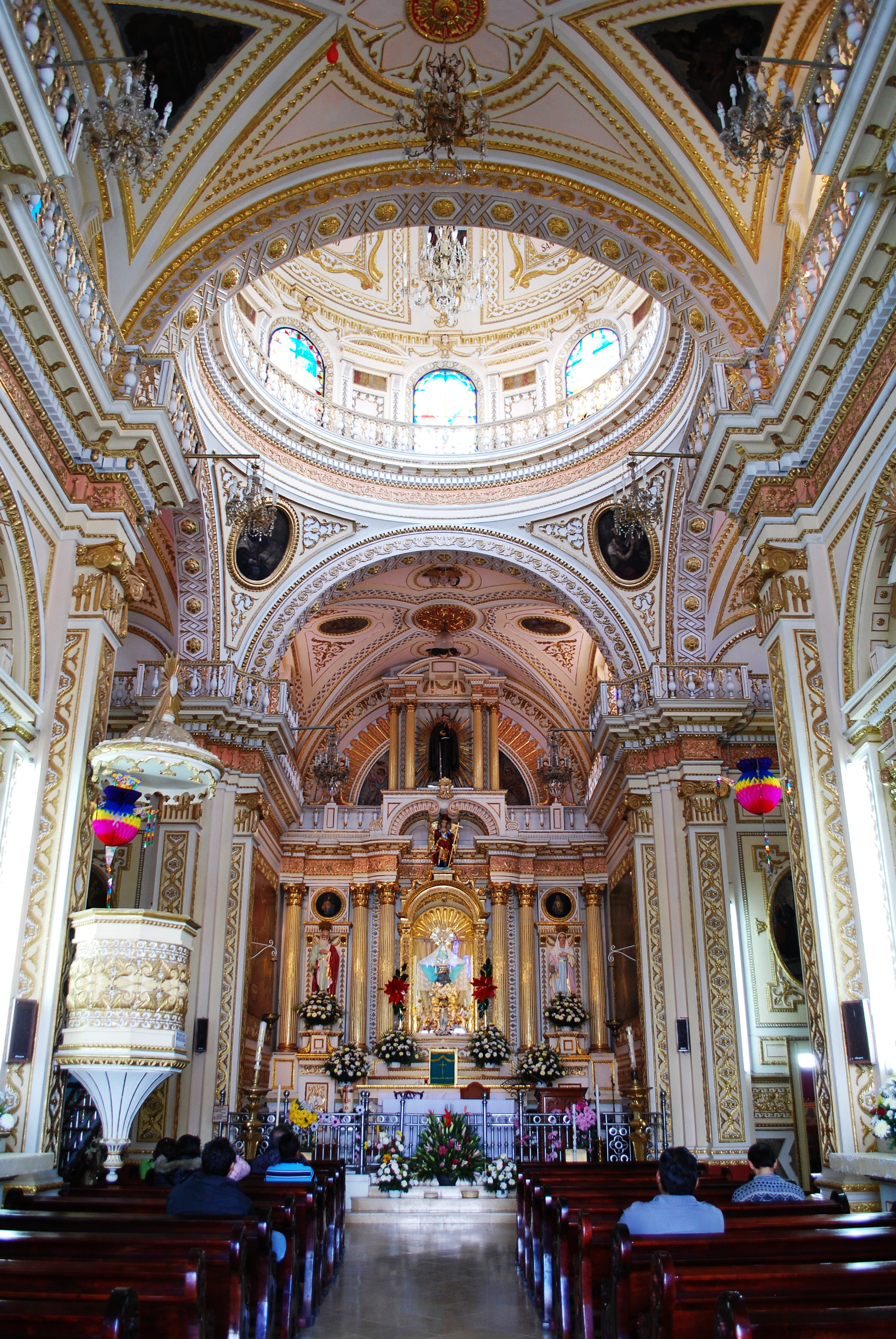
The main altar

The basilica was built with carved stone and it was ornamented with 24-carat gold leaf lamella. The altar has a neoclassic style like the rest of the decoration. In 1595, the painter Alfonso de Villasana crafted the pictures seen on the walls of the basilica.

== Image of Our Lady of Remedies ==
The image of Our Lady of the Remedies that protects the church is 27 cm high and is carved and gilded. It arrived on Mexican soil in 1519 with Captain Juan Rodríguez de Villafuerte, who brought it from the Basque Country, Spain, to protect him during the campaign. Various versions exist of a legend about its prior history and origins as far back as 700 AD. It was in Veracruz where Rodríguez de Villafuerte presided at the first mass celebrated in Mexico, on April 21, 1519, the same year as Hernán Cortés's mandate was affirmed by the Spanish in the Templo Mayor of Tenochtitlan.

In 1520, when the Spanish under Cortés were defeated by the Aztecs while fleeing by way of Naucalpan, de Villafuerte concealed the image in a native temple on the highest part of the hill of Otocampulco. Twenty years later, indigenous people discovered it there under an aloe plant, and from then on, the virgin was kept in the house of the chief of San Juan Totoltepec, until he built a chapel. On the map of Santa Cruz, this chapel is shown with the name of Our Lady of Victory.

Since 1594, the church has been dedicated to Our Lady of Remedies.
