= Cholula, Puebla =

City and district in Puebla, Mexico

Cholula San Pedro Cholula/San Andrés Cholula
- City and district
- Cholula de Rivadavia
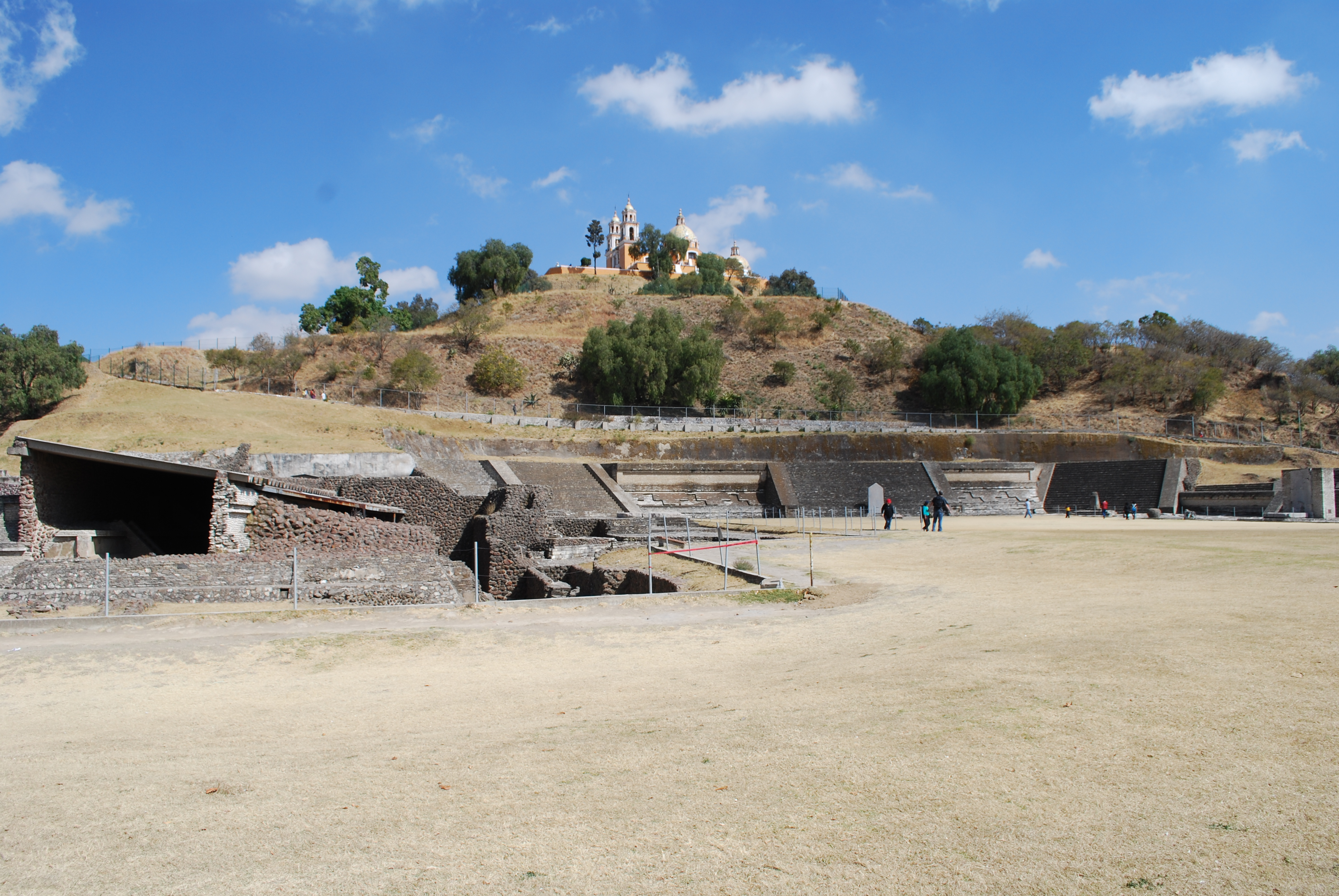
- View of Pyramid and church

- Location within Puebla (state) Location within Mexico
- Coordinates: 19°03′48″N 98°18′23″W
- Country: Mexico
- State: Puebla
- Founded: roughly 500 BCE
- Municipal Status: 1860s

Government
  - Municipal Presidents: José Juan Espinosa (San Pedro) and Leoncio Paisano (San Andrés)

Area
  - Total: 111.03 km^{2} (42.87 sq mi)
- Elevation (of seat): 2,150 m (7,050 ft)

Population (2020)
  - Total: 292,881
  - Density: 2,640/km^{2} (6,830/sq mi)
  - Urban: 149,256
- Time zone: UTC-6 (Central (US Central))
- Postal code (of seat): 72810
- Area code: 222
- Demonym: Choluteco
- Website: (in Spanish) San Andrés and San Pedro

Cholula (Spanish: [tʃoˈlula], officially Cholula de Rivadavia; Mezquital Otomi: Mä'ragi), is a city and district located in the metropolitan area of Puebla, Mexico. Cholula is best known for its Great Pyramid, with the Iglesia de Nuestra Señora de los Remedios sanctuary on top, as well as its numerous churches.

The city and district of Cholula are divided into two: San Pedro Cholula and San Andrés Cholula. Surrounding the city proper are a number of more rural communities which belong to the municipalities of San Andrés and San Pedro. The city itself is divided into eighteen neighborhoods or barrios, each with a patron saint.

This division has pre-Hispanic origins as does the division into two municipalities. The city is unified by a complicated system of shared religious responsibilities, called cargas, which function mostly to support a very busy calendar of saints' days and other festivals which occur in one part or another almost all year round. The most important of these festivals is that dedicated to the Virgin of the Remedies, the patron of the city in its entirety, which occurs at the beginning of September. It is one of the oldest continuously inhabited cities on Earth. Pre-Columbian Cholula grew from a small village to a regional center during the 7th century. It is the oldest still-inhabited city in the Americas.

== City makeup and non religious landmarks ==
=== General description ===
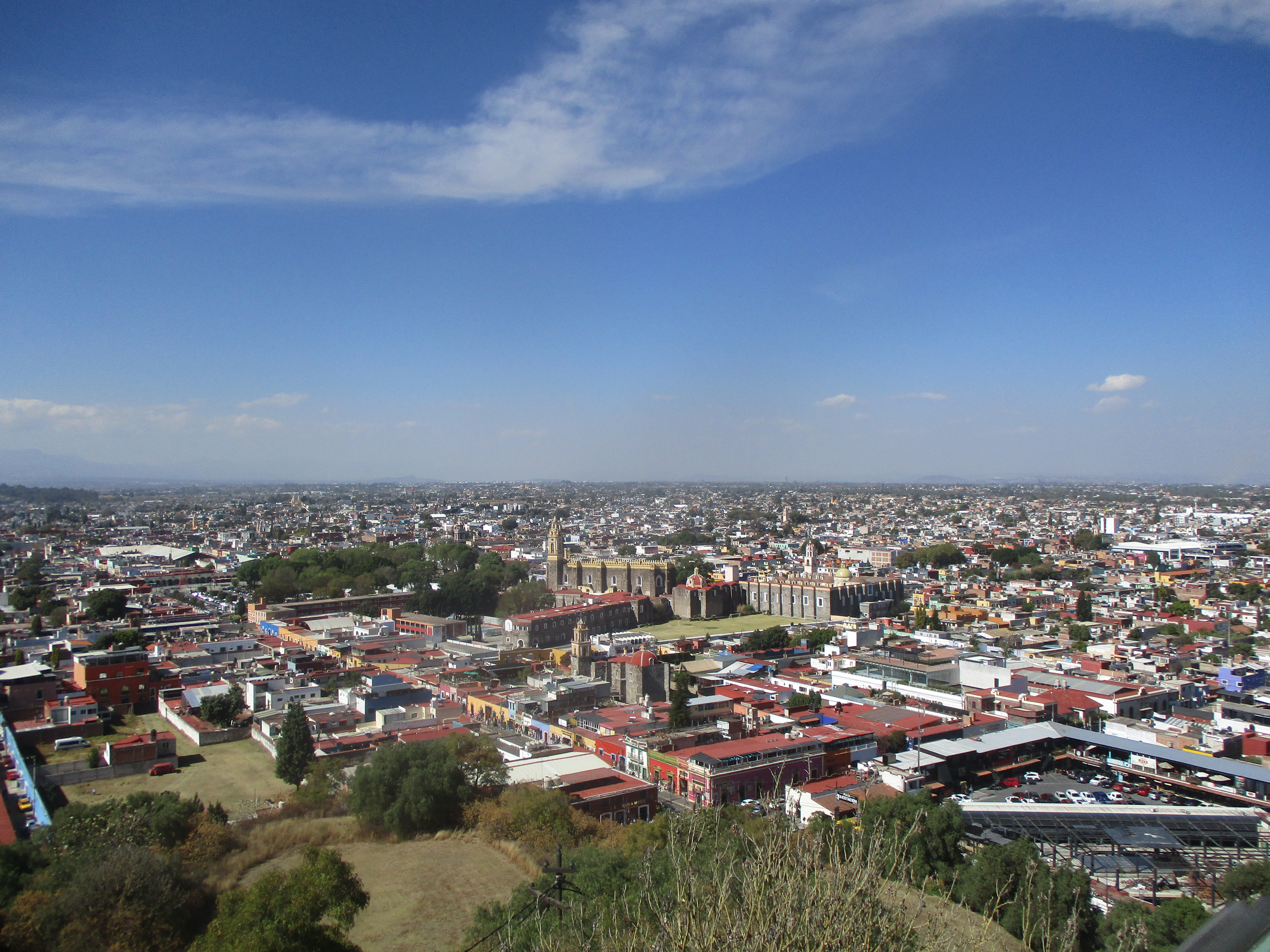
Overlooking the San Gabriel Franciscan Convent and city from the Pyramid

The city of Cholula is located just west of the state capital of Puebla and is part of its metropolitan area. The city is divided into two municipalities, called San Pedro Cholula and San Andrés Cholula, which also include a number of smaller communities that surround the city proper. The main plaza of the city is located in the municipality of San Pedro Cholula, but the Great Pyramid, located only a few blocks away, is located in San Andrés Cholula. Of the two sub-divisions, San Andrés is more residential and has the higher indigenous population. The city as a whole is officially called the Distrito Cholula de Rivadavia. It was created in 1895 and named in honor of Bernardino de Rivadavia.

Since the early colonial period, the city has been organized into eighteen barrios or neighborhoods. The pre-Hispanic city had official neighborhoods, called capullis, which the Spanish reorganized around parish churches, each with a patron saint. The official chronicler of the city, however, still refers to the neighborhoods by their pre-Hispanic term. Eight of the barrios are located in the municipality of San Andrés and ten are located in San Pedro. The neighborhoods of San Pedro Cholula are San Miguel Tianguisnahuac, Jesús Tlatempa, Santiago Mixquitla, San Matías Cocoyotla, San Juan Calvario Texpolco, San Cristóbal Tepontla, Santa María Xixitla, La Magdalena Coapa, San Pedro Mexicaltzingo and San Pablo Tecama. The neighborhoods of San Andres Cholula are San Miguel Xochimehuacan, Santiago Xicotenco, San Pedro Colomoxco, Santa María Coaco, La Santísima, San Juan Aquiahuac, San Andresito and Santo Niño. Most of these barrios have a patron saint's name followed by the indigenous name (from the Nahuatl language) that remains from the pre-Hispanic period. The neighborhoods closest to the center are urbanized, with those on the edges of the city maintaining more of their rural character, with economies based primarily on agriculture and brick-making. The main unifying factor of these neighborhoods and municipalities is a complicated framework of regular cyclical social events, which are sponsored in rotation among the various barrios. Many Cholutecans still use their pre-Hispanic surnames, such as former town stewards Raymundo Tecanhuehue and Humberto Tolama Totozintle. This is because a number of members of the old Indian nobility were allowed certain privileges after the Conquest.

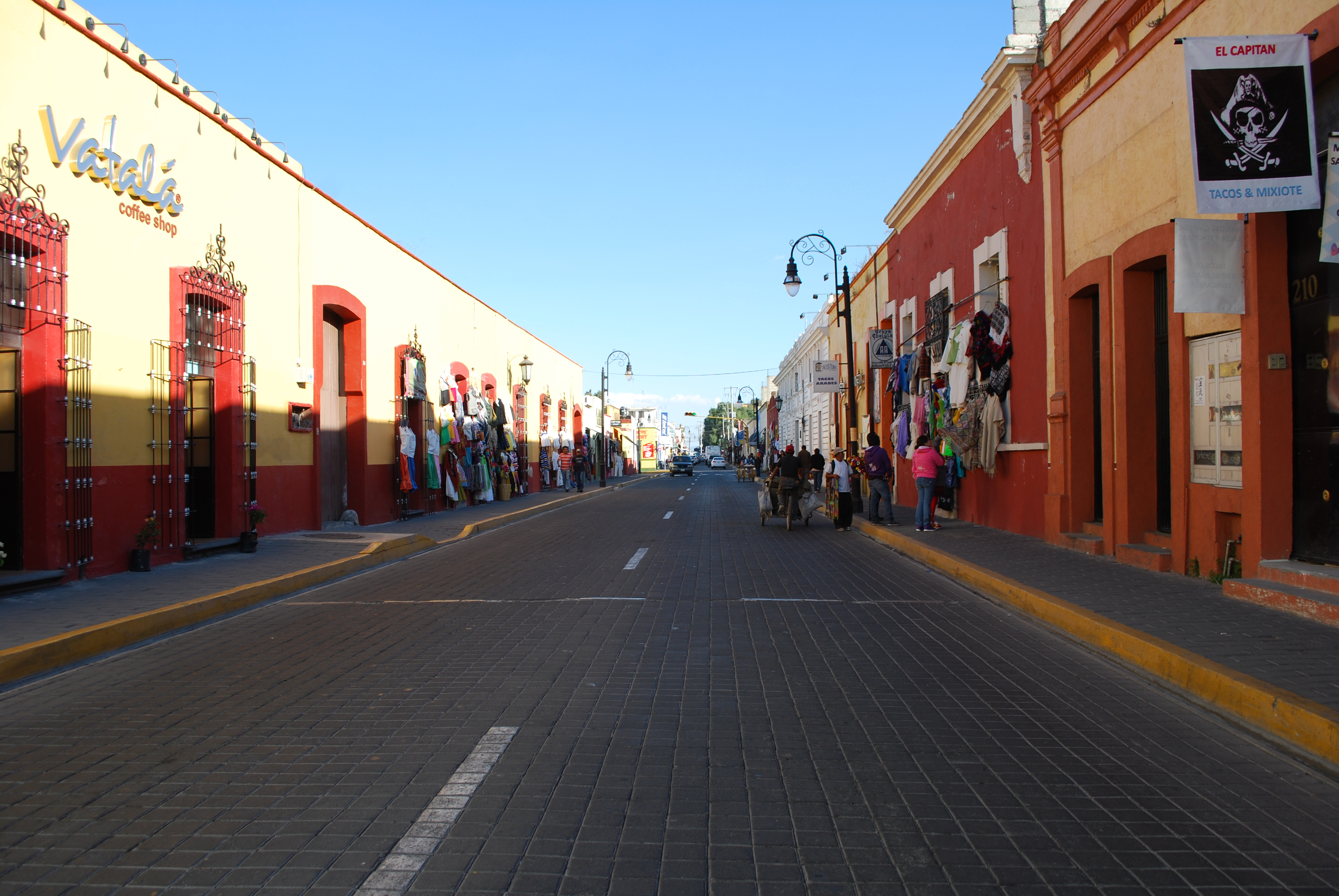
Looking west on Morelos Street in the downtown

The city is located on the flat plains of the Valley of Puebla, with Popocatépetl and Iztaccíhuatl visible to the west. Like the city of Puebla, it has a straight street grid oriented to the cardinal directions. Most streets in the center are numbered with indications as to their location vis-à-vis the center, north, east, south or west. On the city periphery, street names lose this system. In the center of this grid is the main square of the city which is called the Plaza de la Concordia, or sometimes the Zocalo. In the morning, this plaza is filled with vendors selling typical street food, sweets and handcrafted toys for children. On the west side of the plaza, there is the city hall, which was built over the former Xiuhcalli (House of Turquoise) where a council of nobles met during pre-Hispanic times. This government building is fronted by a line of businesses, which in turn are fronted by a 170 metres (560 ft) gallery, marked by 46 arches supported by Doric columns, called the portales. This arcade is the longest of its kind in Latin America.

On the east side of the main plaza is the 16th-century friary of San Gabriel, with its very large atrium, Capilla Real (Royal Chapel), Capilla de la Tercera Orden (Chapel of the Third Order), tall main church and Franciscan Library. Its cloister is still inhabited by about fifteen Franciscan friars. On the north side, there is the Parish of San Pedro, built in the 17th century. On another side of the plaza, one of the oldest residential structures in the Cholula area, called the Casa del Caballero Aguilar (House of the Eagle Knight) was converted into the Museo de la Ciudad de Cholula (Cholula City Museum). This museum was opened in September 2001, after a renovation project beginning in 1997 restored interior and exterior features such as stone sculptures as well as the original floor plan. The museum is a joint project of the city, INAH and the Universidad de las Americas Puebla. The museum traces the history of Cholula from about 1000 BCE through five rooms. The first three contain pre-Hispanic artifacts and the last two contain pieces and exhibitions related to the colonial period including religious art. The rooms also contain elements which recreate aspects of a colonial era home. The basis of the museum's collection is a group of about 1,500 artifacts from Omar Jimenez, from both the pre-Hispanic and colonial eras. There is also an area dedicated to photography of the city's religious festivals, and laboratories dedicated to the restoration of excavated objects.

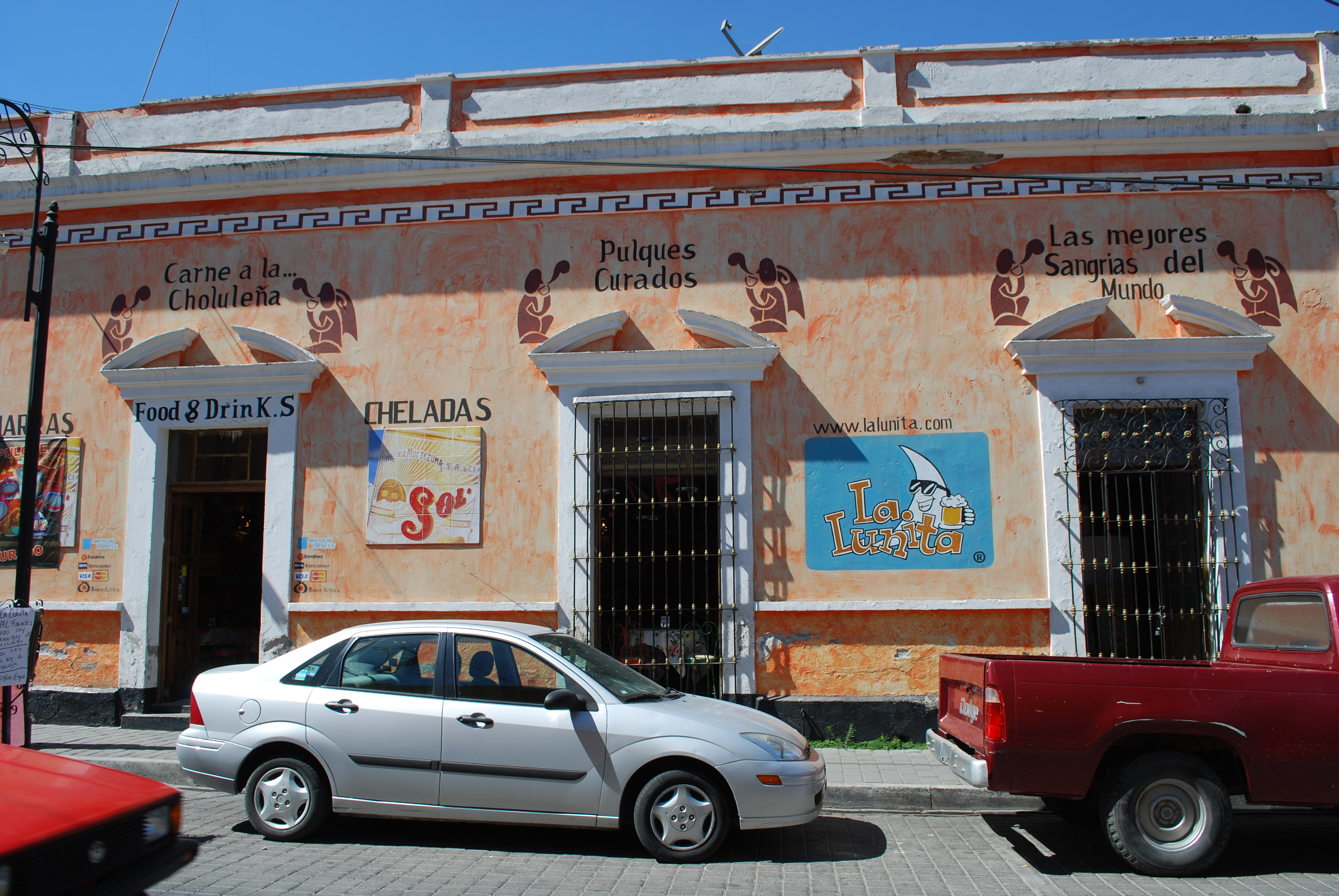
La Lunita Bar

Because of the student population associated with the Universidad de las Américas, and the area's popularity with tourists, the city has a lively nightclub and bar scene, mostly concentrated around the main plaza and in a part of the San Andrés municipality. However, the city is quiet during the week when these establishments are closed.

As the modern city is built over what was a major pre-Hispanic metropolis, a large part of the area has been designated as an archeological heritage site. However, only six of the 154 hectares (380 acres) declared as such have been investigated as most of the land is privately owned. This includes the Pyramid and some areas under streets where water pipes and sewerage have been modernized. There is opposition to further exploration by many residents as they are concerned that the excavation will cause inconvenience, expropriation of their lands or that the excavated areas will be subject to vandalism.

=== Landmarks ===
La Quinta Luna is a 17th-century house located in the Santa María Xixitla neighborhood, cataloged by INAH as a historic monument. It was converted into a boutique hotel, affiliated with the Hoteles Boutique de México. It was the home of an indigenous noble by the name of Juan de León y Mendoza, built with adobe walls and very high ceilings. The hotel contains seven luxury rooms, a meeting room, a library, a lobby and a restaurant, surrounding a central courtyard which has a garden. The lobby and restaurant are located in what was the chapel. The library area contains about 3,000 books and its roof is crossed by beams which were rescued during renovations to the building. The decoration is based on paintings by Federico Silva and Gerardo Gomez Brito, various pieces done in local onyx and a number of antiques from various places in the world. The lobby occasionally hosts small concerts.

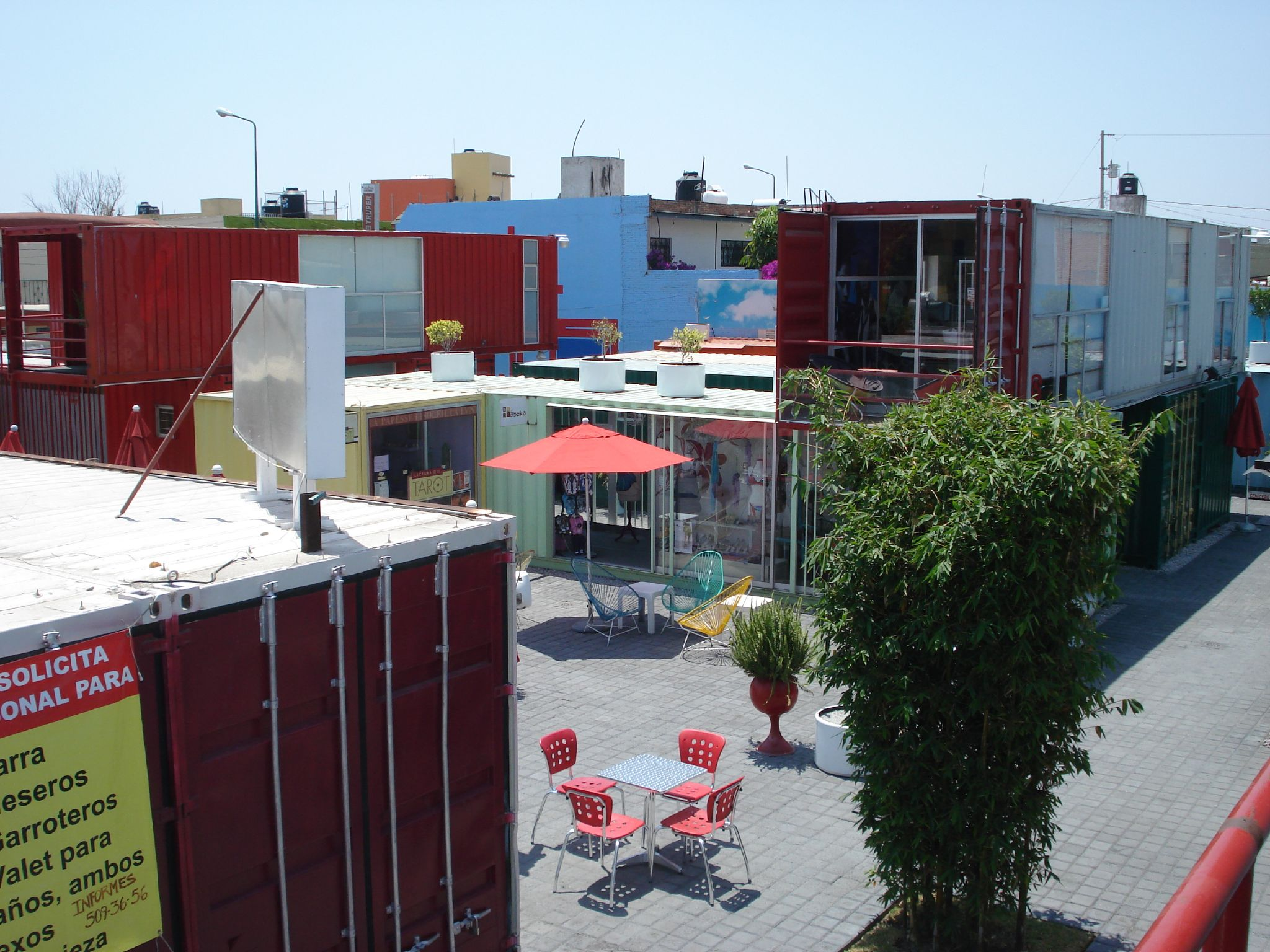
Cholula container city

Container City is a complex constructed from large shipping containers, located at the intersection of 12 Oeste and 2 Norte. The idea is from England, but this version was built by a Mexican organization. Fifty of these containers have been joined and painted with bright colors to create 4,500 metres (14,800 ft) of spaces used to house workshops, restaurants, galleries and other businesses. There are even a few homes made of the containers in the area. The hallways have wireless Internet service, a music lounge for visitors, an entertainment area, ping pong tables and more.

Parque Loro is a petting zoo containing more than 400 animals, including endangered species like monkeys, tigers, jaguars, pumas, reptiles and miniature horses. It has an auditorium with animal shows. It also has a playground, an area for pre-Hispanic dance and an area in which visitors can have their picture taken with an animal.

The city contains a number of traditional Mexican markets. The largest of these is the Mercado Municipal. This market has conserved its traditional look with women seated on the floor selling seeds, flowers, herbs, and more. On Wednesdays and Sundays, this market is augmented by street vendors, which is called a tianguis, because on these days, people from the communities surrounding the city come to buy and sell. The market specializes in locally produced products, especially flowers, fruit, vegetables and others. There are also food stands preparing local dishes. Some of the local specialties include Cholulteca soup, cecina with chili pepper strips and queso de canasta cheese, a type of edible larvae called cueclas, tacos placeros, prepared with cecina, Bolivian coriander (pápalo), avocado, cheese and green chili pepper strips and orejas de elefante ('elephant ears') which is an enormous tortilla with beans inside and salsa, tomatoes and cheese outside. There is a locally produced hard apple cider called "Copa de Oro," a cold drink made of chocolate and water, whipped until foamy and served in wooden bowls with flowers painted on them, and ponche, which in Cholula is a drink prepared with blue corn and milk.

There is a community just outside the city on the San Andrés side called San Luis Tehuiloyocan, which has a 17th-century house, which is boarded up and the exterior is deteriorated. This house is not promoted for tourism and generally not talked about. However, the walls of the large inner courtyard have mosaics of encrusted volcanic stone that depict a goat, a rabbit, flames and elements of the Passion of Christ, such as the weeping face of Saint Veronica, her tears flowing red. The dominant images framing the main doorway are two monkeys with their tongues sticking out and dancing. On the ends of their legs are crow's feet and on their heads are bishops' hats. Both have erect penises and have bowls of steaming liquid in front of them. In a room in the back, there is a beam with the "Magnificat" a speech by the Virgin Mary, in Latin and in reverse. Christian iconography has used the monkey as a symbol of people in the control of the Devil and many suspect the house was used for satanic rites, especially in the 18th century. It is the only example known of its kind in Mexico.

The Antigua Casa del Gobernador (Old Governor's House) was probably built after San Andrés received its status as an Indian Republic, which was in 1714. This building held sessions of the council, elections for governor, mayors and other officials of the Republic. During the 19th century, it remained as the city council hall, but today is a multipurpose facility.

== Churches ==
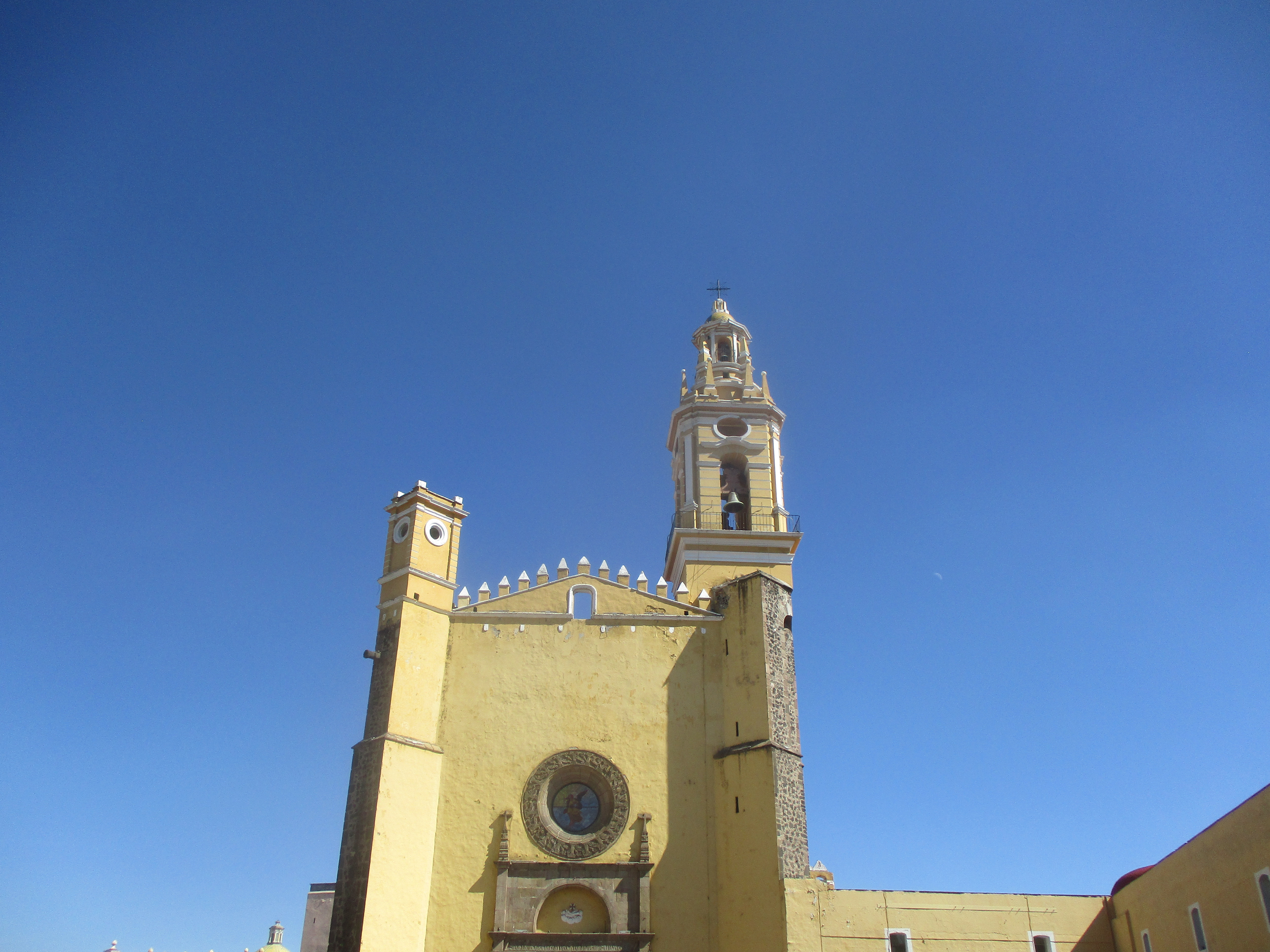
Facade of the main church of the San Gabriel monastery

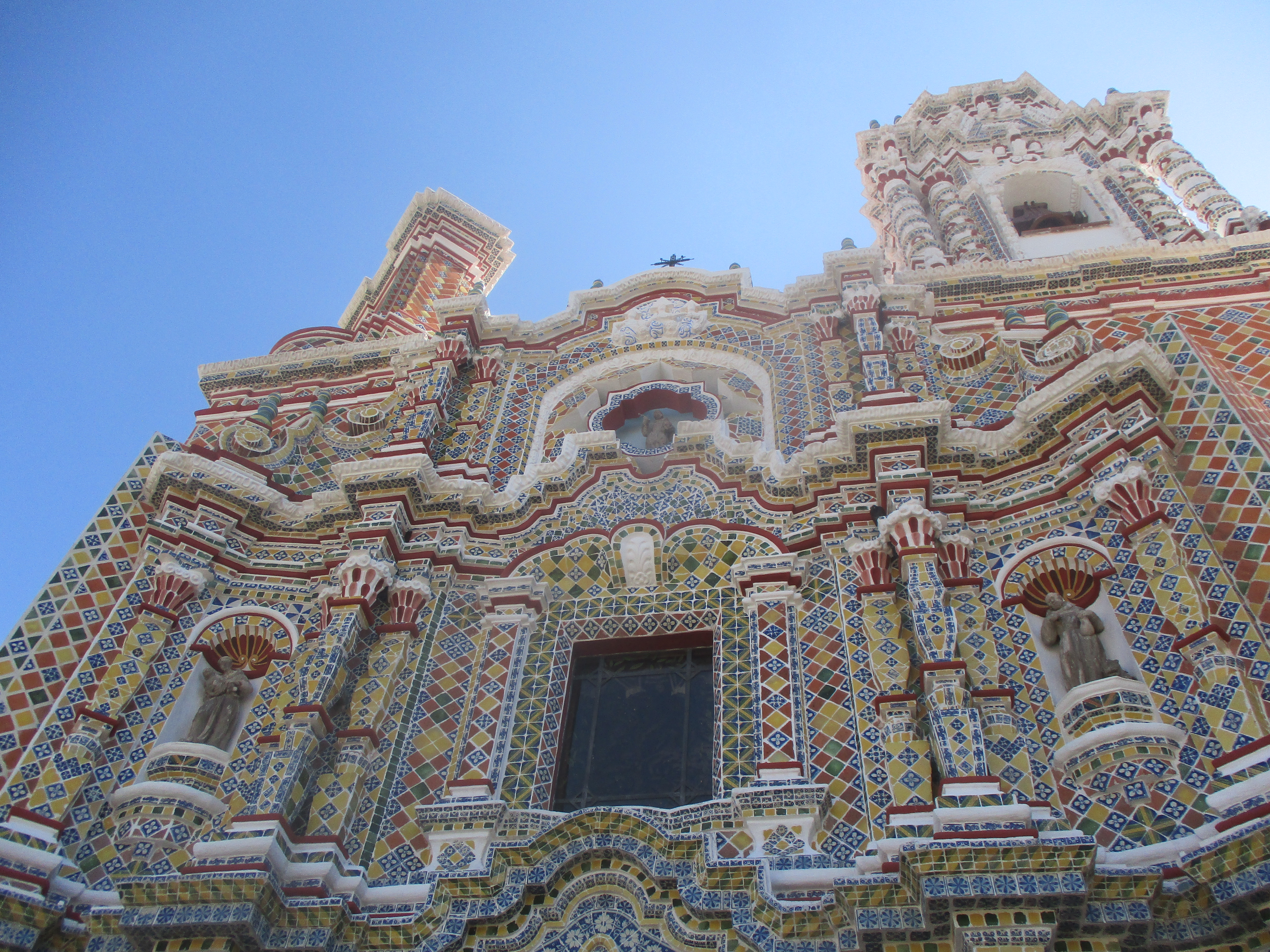
Church in Cholula

It is said that the city of Cholula has 365 churches, either one for each day of the year or one for each pre-Hispanic temple that used to be there. In reality, there are only 37 churches; or 159, if all the small chapels including those on local haciendas and ranches are counted. One legend states that the first chapel to be built in Cholula was in the San Miguelito neighborhood on what is now the outskirts of the city. It was the first structure with a red tile roof, and it was dedicated to the Archangel Michael. It is said to have contained an image of the angel, which contained inside a small demon tied to a post. As people venerated the image of the archangel, they also acknowledged the demon, in case the angel decided not to hear their pleas. This eventually gave the chapel an evil reputation as more came to ask for favors from the demon, favors that one would not ask of a saint or angel. The demon began to be blamed for misfortunes that befell in the area, as, the legend said, when they occurred, the demon image would be found untied. Eventually, the image of the archangel with the demon inside was taken away and eventually disappeared.

The architectural styles of these churches vary from Gothic to Renaissance to Churrigueresque and Neoclassical, with many mixing elements of two or more. A number also have Talavera tile as a decorative feature, which is common in Puebla. A few have intricate stucco work done by indigenous hands. These churches together contain more than 300 works of art from the 16th to 19th centuries, which have a total value of millions of dollars. Increases in the theft of religious art have led to a number of measures being taken to protect them. Over a decade ago, churches were routinely open during the week, but now many are not. When they are open, many have at least one guard on duty, or in the case of the Nuestra Señora de los Remedios church, video surveillance. Some churches put replicas of the works on display, such as in the friary of San Gabriel. Some do not permit photographs or video of the church interiors.

Various church steeples in the city fell during the 2017 Puebla earthquake.

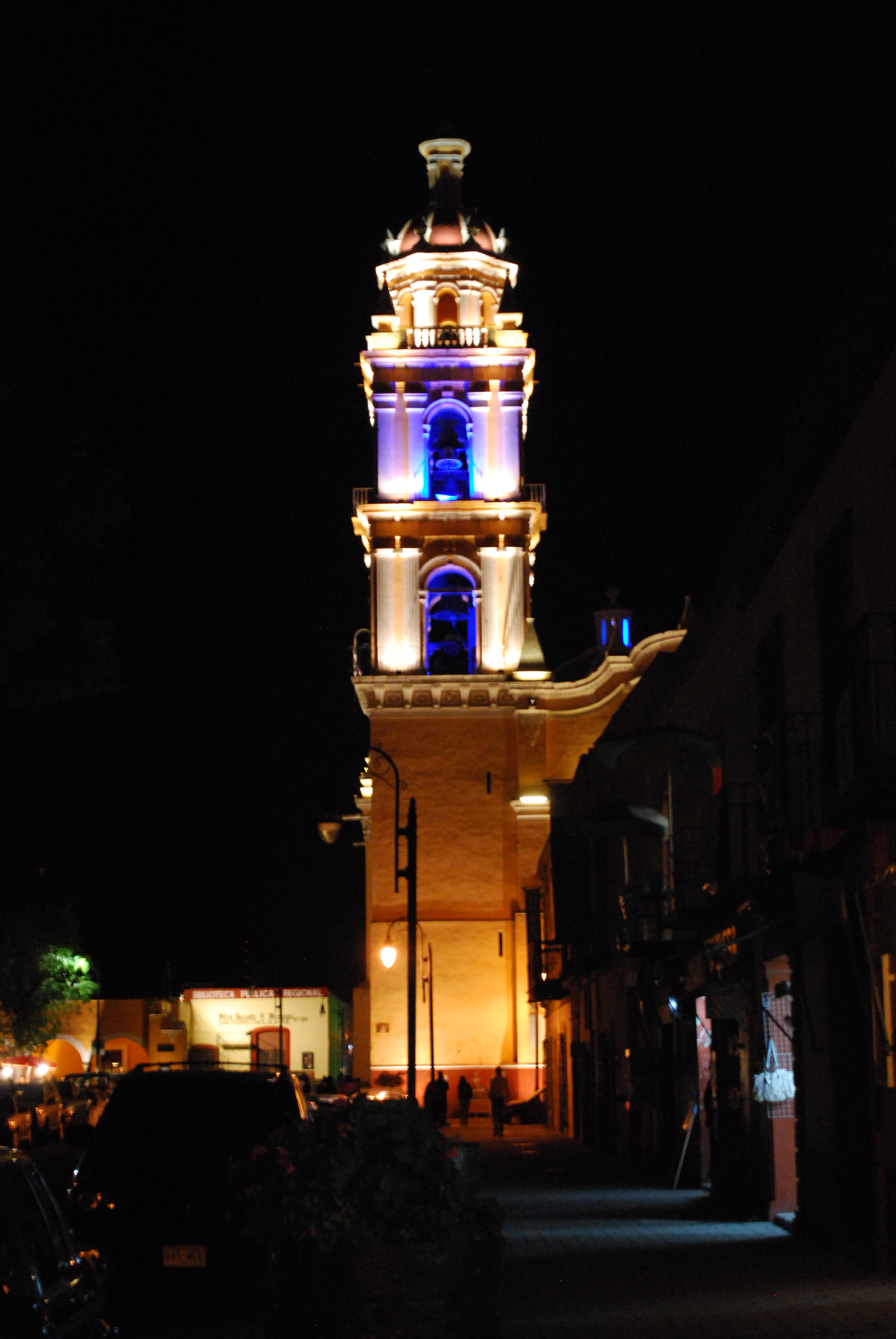
Parish of San Pedro

Most of the rest of the city's churches date from the 17th to the 19th centuries and many of them are parish churches which belong to the various neighborhoods or barrios of the city proper. However, there are also several important churches in the smaller communities of the two municipalities just outside the urban area. The Parish of San Pedro is the parish church for the San Pedro municipality. It was built in the 17th century and is located facing the main square of the city. The style is a mixture of Baroque and Renaissance, with a Churrigueresque cupola. Other important churches of the San Pedro municipality include the parishes of San Miguel Tianguishhahuatl, Jesus Tlatempa, Santiago Mixquitla, San Matias Cocoyotla, San Juan Texpolco, San Cristóbal Tepontla, San Juan Texpolco, Santa Maria Xixitla, La Magdalena Coapa, San Pedro Mexicaltzingo, San Pablo Tecama, Santa Cruz de Jerusalén, Santo Sepulcro and San Miguelito.

The parish church of the San Andrés municipality was begun in the first third of the 16th century and finished in the first half of the 17th. The main façade is made of gray sandstone with three levels on which is a very large image of the Apostle Andrew, crucified on an X. The first contains the main entrance into the building, which is a simple arch with spandrels decorated with flowers. Just outside the door, there is a holy water font which is probably from the 16th century. The doorway niches contain images of San Bernardino and San Antonio, which was not common during the colonial period. The interior has only one nave as it was constructed in the 16th century. On the left side, there is a chapel of the Virgin of Solitude, which was constructed in the middle of the 18th century. It contains a Churrigueresque altar, with highly decorated pilasters. The decoration on the cupolas were done in the second half of the 18th century and redone at the end of the 19th. This chapel also contains a large number of paintings which date back as far as the 17th century.

Two other significant churches in this part of the city are the Iglesia de Nuestra Señora de los Remedios and the Church of San Francisco Acatepec. Nuestra Señora de los Remedios is the best known as it is the church that is located on top of the Cholula Pyramid. This church was built in 1594 and is home to an image of the Virgin of the Remedies, the patron of Cholula. The first church collapsed in an earthquake in 1854 and was rebuilt. The new church was damaged again by an earthquake in 1999 but repaired. The pyramid it is on was a pilgrimage site in pre-Hispanic times, and it remains one now with people coming to visit this Virgin image.

One other important church of the San Andrés municipality is the Church of Santa María Tonantzintla, which is valued for its decoration in what is called folk or indigenous Baroque.

== Pyramid of Cholula and Our Lady of Remedies Church ==
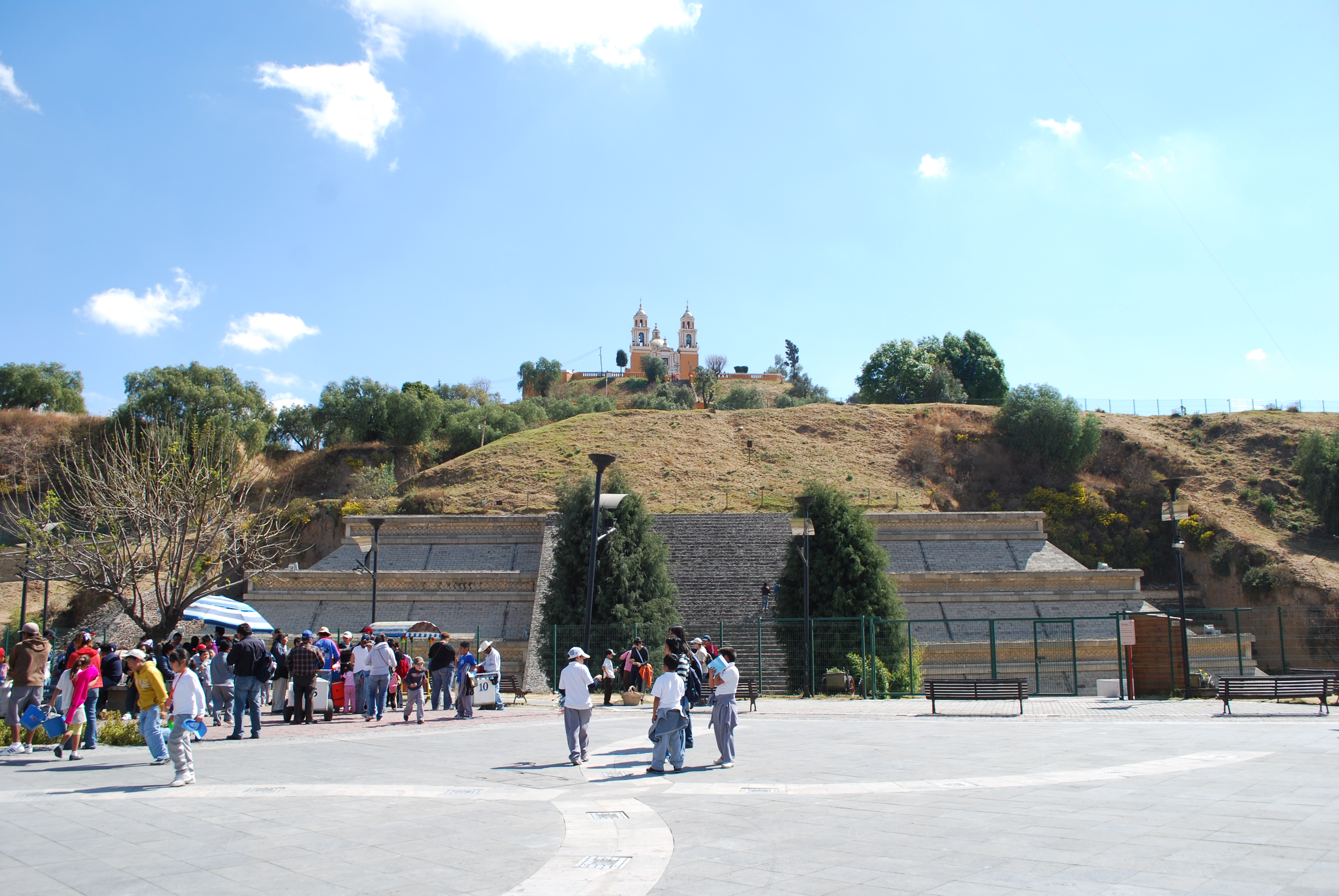
Great Pyramid of Cholula with the Nuestra Señora de los Remedios church on top

The most important tourist attraction of the city is the Great Pyramid with the Nuestra Señora de los Remedios sanctuary on top. At first glance, the pyramid looks like a hill as most of it is overgrown. The south side of the pyramid has been excavated and there is a network of tunnels inside. The pyramid and church receives about 220,000 visitors each year, and on certain special occasions such as the spring equinox and the feast of the Virgin of the Remedies, there can be up to 20,000 visitors at a time. From the top of the pyramid, in the sanctuary atrium, it is possible to see the Malinche, Popocatepetl, Iztaccíhuatl and Pico de Orizaba Volcanoes in the far eastern horizon.

=== The pyramid ===
According to myth, the pyramid was built by a giant named Xelhua of adobe bricks, after he escaped a flood in the neighboring Valley of Mexico. The pyramid is small part of the archeological zone of Cholula, which is estimated at 154 hectares (380 acres). Building of the pyramid began in the pre Classic period and over time was built over six times to its final dimensions of 120 metres (390 ft) on each side at the base and 18 metres (59 ft) tall. This base is four times the size of that of the Great Pyramid of Giza and is the largest pyramid base in the Americas. Two of the stages of construction use talud-tablero architecture which was also used in Teotihuacan . Some of the pyramid constructions have had burials, with skeletons found in various positions, with many offerings, especially ceramics. The last state of construction has stairs on the west side leading to a temple on top, which faced Iztaccíhuatl.

However, the pyramid has been overgrown for centuries. In the 12th century, after the Toltec–Chichimecas took over the city, religious focus shifted away from the pyramid and to a new temple. By the time the Spanish arrived, the pyramid was overgrown, and by the 19th century it was still undisturbed, with only the church built in the 16th century visible.

Exploration of the pyramid began in 1931 under architect Ignacio Marquina who dug tunnels to explore the substructures. The successive pyramids and other structures of the site have been given letters and numbers to identify them, with 'Building A' designating the first pyramid constructed. Two major sets of explorations were undertaken at the site. The first was between 1931 and 1957, and the second was between 1966 and 1974. There is still minor work ongoing.

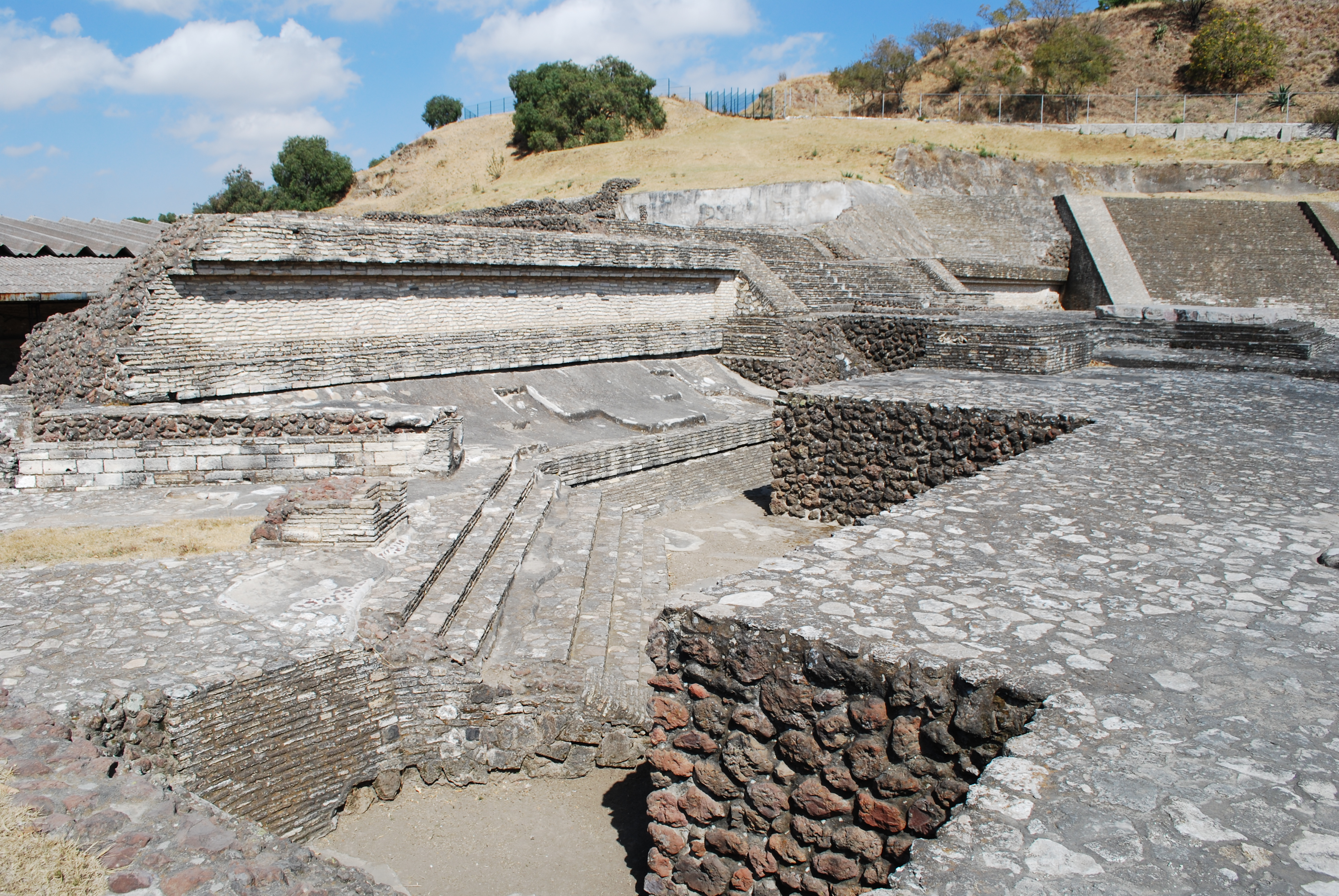
Northwest corner of the Patio of the Altars

These excavations have dug about 8 kilometres (5.0 mi) of tunnels inside the pyramid, which began with two in 1931 to prove that the hill was an archeological find. Within, he discovered altars with offerings, floors, walls and buried human remains from around 900 CE. Today, only about 800 meters of these tunnels are open to the public, which have been made into well-lit, arched passages. Visitors enter on the north side, through the center of the pyramid and exit on the south side. There are few signs explaining the structures within, but in one section allows a view of main staircases of one of the pyramids, whose nine floors have been excavated from bottom to top. There are also two famous murals. One is called "Chapulines" which consists of images of grasshoppers with a black skull in the middle. And the other is the "Bebidores" which depicts various figures drinking out of vessels most commonly used for pulque. Cholula, despite its importance, has not been studied as intensively as other Mesoamerican sites, and most of what does exist are technical field reports with few syntheses of data gathered. For this reason, it has not played a significant role in the understanding of Mesoamerica to date. Due to the condition of the surface and the large number of artifacts just under the surface, it is not possible to reconstruct the last stage of the pyramid to what it was. Around the pyramid, there are a number of other structures and patios, which form a massive complex. The Patio of the Altars was the main access to the pyramid and is named for the various altars that surround a main courtyard.

The Cholula Pyramid site museum is located across the street from the north side of the pyramid, separated by the main road that connects Cholula to Puebla. It is a small museum with two halls. The first contains a model cut away to show the various stages of the pyramid's construction. The second hall features finds from the area including clay figures, pots, other containers, and items of stone and shell, along with recreations of the two main murals of the pyramid complex. There is also a small enclosure with reproductions of the two main murals of the pyramid. For many years the museum was a psychiatric hospital run by Catholic brothers before it was converted to a museum.

The Quetzalcoatl ritual is performed on the pyramid on both the spring and fall equinoxes, with poetry, indigenous dance, music played on pre-Hispanic instruments and fireworks. Due to the large number of people who visit at this time, the INAH blocks off the archeological site, allowing people access only to the reconstructed pyramid section on the west side. Other measures to protect the site have also been implemented. Certain large fireworks have been banned by the city and the Catholic Church because they cause serious vibrations in the pyramid's tunnels. The archeological zone is guarded by a mounted police unit, as motor vehicles are not permitted to climb the structure. Some of the land around the pyramid has been bought by authorities and made into soccer fields, and sown with flowers, in order to create a buffer between the construction of homes and the pyramid.

=== Nuestra Señora de los Remedios church ===
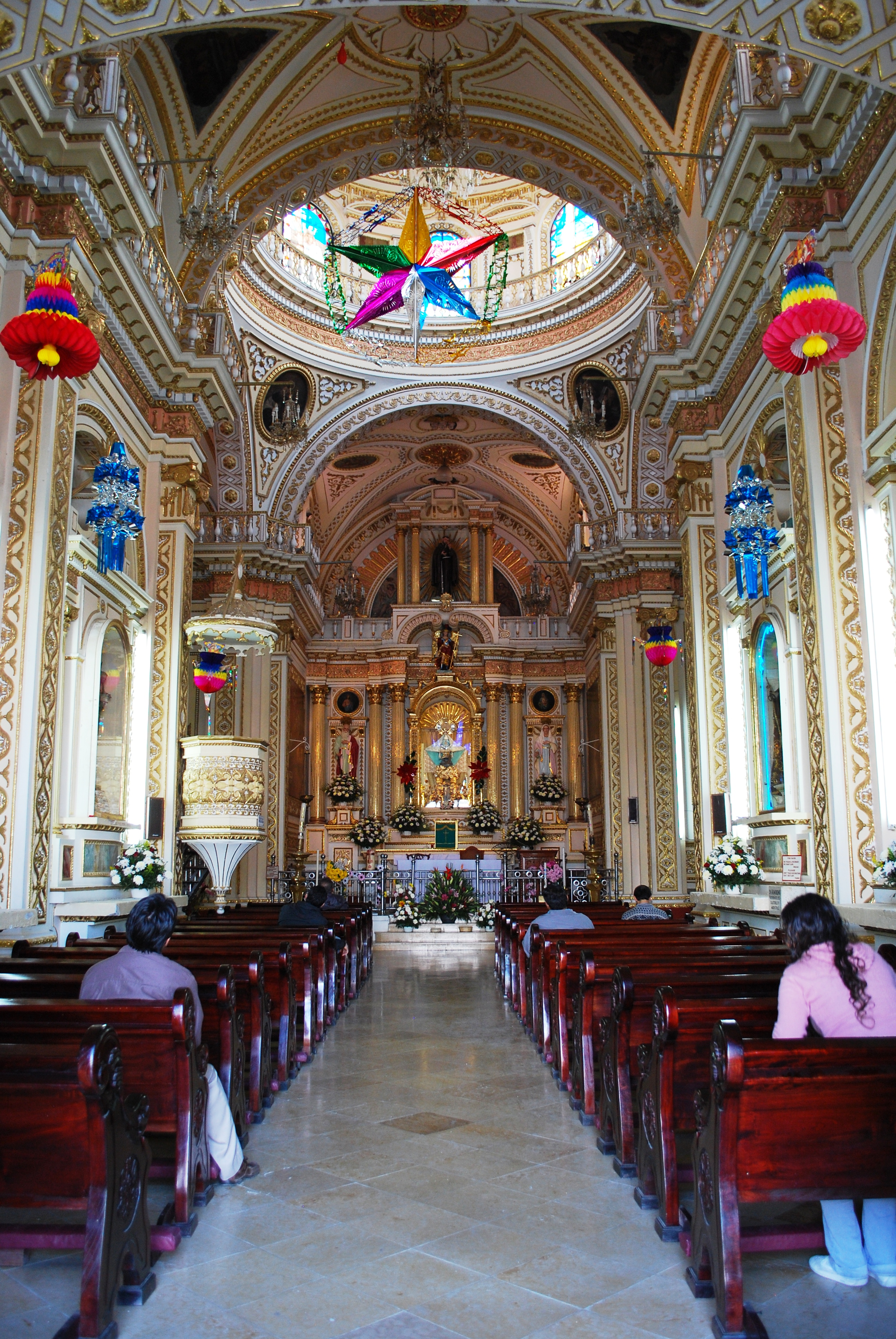
Main nave of the Nuestra Señora de los Remedios church

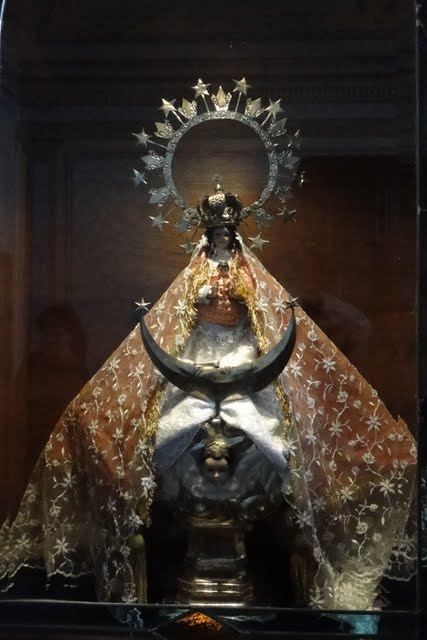
Nuestra Senora

The pyramid was a place of pilgrimage in the pre-Hispanic period, and it is a place of pilgrimage today, to visit an image known as the Virgin of the Remedies, especially in September. The Virgin of the Remedies is a variation of the Virgin Mary specifically dedicated to the needs of the poor. Veneration of this Virgin in Mexico dates back to the Conquest, with various stories surrounding how this particular manifestation became associated with the Spanish conquest of the Aztec Empire. Most revolve around a conquistador by the name of Juan Rodríguez de Villafuerte. One story states that he brought this image with him before leaving for the New World by a soldier who had fought in Italy. Another states that she was carried by Villafuerte, but lost during the Noche Triste only to be found later by a local indigenous man. Yet another states that an image of this Virgin appeared on the sleeve of Franciscan friar Martín de Valencia, while praying on the pyramid mound of Cholula. The Virgin of the Remedies is strongly associated with the Conquest as the protector of the conquistadors. She was made a "general" of the Spanish army in their battles against the indigenous of New Spain. During the Mexican War of Independence, she was invoked by royalist forces, while the insurgents carried the banner of the Virgin of Guadalupe. For this reason, this image is also called the Virgen Gachupina, as "gachupina" is a derogatory word for the Spanish used in Mexico. The Virgin of the Remedies was one of four Virgin Mary images which were used to substitute for pre Hispanic female deities in the cardinal directions from Mexico City. This one was placed in the east, with the Virgin of Guadalupe to the north, the Virgin of Mercy to the south and the "Virgen de la Bala" to the south. There is a story that a serpent lives beneath the pyramid. It is likely related to the myth of Quetzalcoatl, the feathered serpent, which was converted to the snake, related to the devil and crushed under the foot of the Virgin Mary.

There are a number of stories of how the particular physical image of the Virgin of the Remedies came to the sanctuary, but she was most likely brought by Franciscan missionaries from Spain for their friary. The image measures 27 centimetres (11 in) tall, similar to those brought by Hernán Cortés and leading to speculation what it was brought by him. Images like this brought by him include the Virgin Conquistador in the San Francisco friary in Puebla, the Virgin of the Defense at the Altar of the Kings in the Puebla cathedral, the Virgin of San Juan de los Lagos, the Virgin of Zapopan and the Virgin of Juquila. There is a story that states that the image was lost from the friary and a bright image of her appeared over the pyramid. The light attracted the Franciscans, who climbed the structure to find the physical image there. This prompted the decision to build the sanctuary to her in this place. 8 September is when the apparition of the image is celebrated, but the image is honored starting the first, and the local annual fair runs from the first to the fifteenth.

The sanctuary to this Virgin manifestation was established in 1594, with the first church built between then and 1666. The church has suffered damage on various occasions from lightning strikes and from earthquakes. Before the Spanish, the pyramid was considered to be sacred to a female rain deity called Chiconāuhquiyahuitl (Nine Rains). She was accredited with striking the new church with lightning and supposedly a stone image of her was found at the site the church is now. The lightning strikes have caused minor damage, but the earthquakes have been more serious. In 1864, the church was almost completely destroyed by an earthquake. It took ten years to rebuild and was re-inaugurated in 1873. In February 1930, there was a robbery at the church. The thieves stole the jewelry that the image had been wearing, including a gold crown, a silver halo and precious stones. The next major quake to damage the building came in 1999, which damaged the towers and caused the pilgrims' portal to collapse, with damage to 80% of the building. However, the image of the Virgin, in her Fabergé box, was undamaged.

After climbing the pyramid, there are 48 steps extending 260 metres (850 ft) up to the church atrium. The atrium cross is placed near the main gate. It dates from 1666 and is identical to the atrium crosses at the San Gabriel Friary and the church of San Miguel Tianguisnahutl. The atrium is small, but its position at the top of the pyramid affords views of the Popocatepetl and Iztaccíhuatl volcanoes, the flat valley floor and the large number of church cupolas that dot the city. The exterior of the church is plain but has a dome covered in multicolored tiles from Puebla.

The interior of the church is Baroque with Neoclassical elements, which is sometimes called "Republican Baroque." It contains oil paintings such as those depicting the birth of the Virgin Mary, the Announcement to the Virgin Mary, Mary and Joseph, and the Sacred Heart of Jesus. Sculptures include those of the Archangel Michael on the main altar, Diego de Alcalá, and Salvador of Horta . The altars are made of wood and plaster painted white and decorated in gold leaf. There is also gold leaf on the vaults and walls. The cupola contains allegorical paintings and on the pendentives, there are the four doctors of the Catholic Church, Francis de Geronimo, Pope Gregory I, Ambrose and Augustine of Hippo, as well as images of John Duns Scotus, Bonaventure, Bernard of Siena, and Anthony of Padua. There are also allegories representing Justice, Faith and Virtue. The vaults contain images related to the praying of the Rosary.

== Neighborhoods and festivals ==
=== Barrios and cargas ===
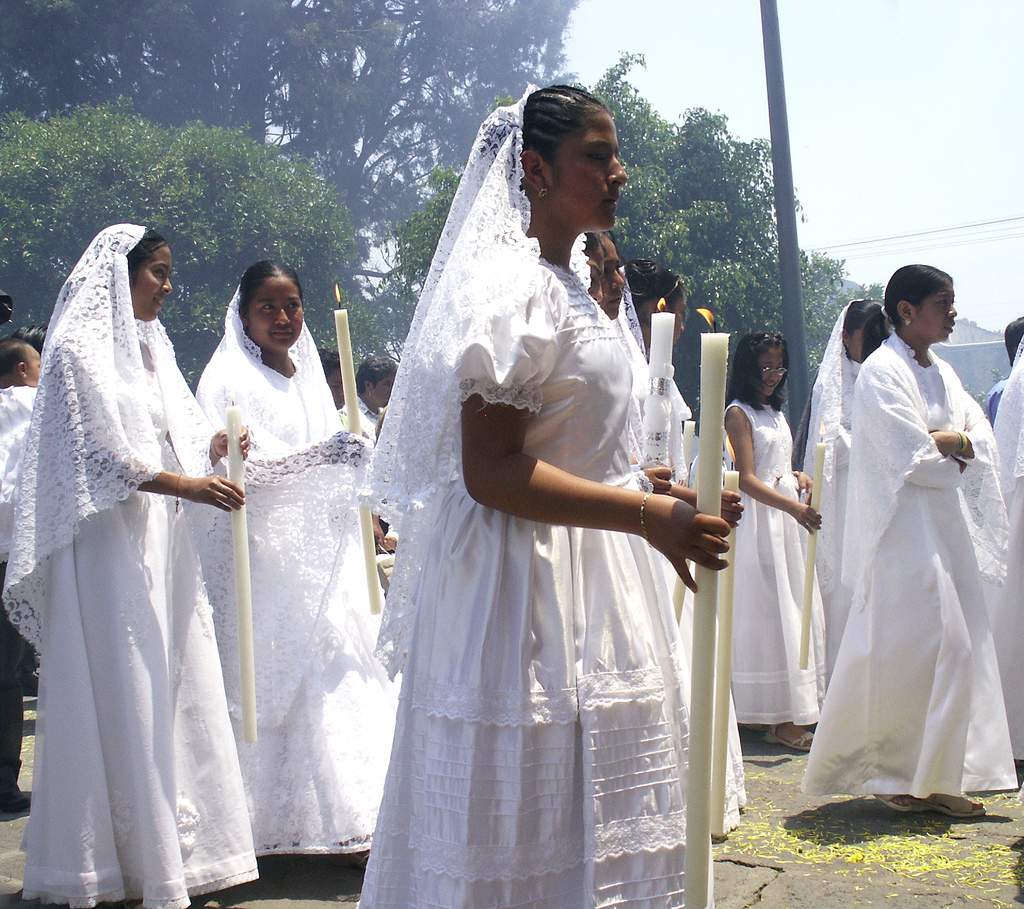
Procession in Cholula

The city of Cholula is made up of two municipalities: San Pedro Cholula and San Andrés Cholula. The more important social division is a system of neighborhoods or barrios. San Pedro consists of eight neighborhoods: are San Miguel Tianguisnahuac, Jesús Tlatempa, Santiago Mixquitla, San Matias Cocoyotla, San Juan Calvario Texpolco, San Cristóbal Tepontla, Santa María Xixitla, La Magdalena Coapa, San Pedro Mexicaltzingo and San Pablo Tecama. San Andrés consists of ten: San Miguel Xochimehuacan, Santiago Xicotenco, San Pedro Colomoxco, Santa María Coaco, La Santísima, San Juan Aquiahuac, San Andresito and Santo Niño. In the pre-Hispanic period, the city was a mixture of ethnicities. What unified them was a common religious belief. After the Conquest, the Spanish reorganized the pre-Hispanic neighborhoods, or capullis, around various patron saints. These neighborhoods remain to this day, whose names refer to their patron saint affixed before the original pre-Hispanic name. The neighborhoods closest to the center are urbanized, with those on the edges of the city maintaining more of their rural character, with economies based on agriculture and brick making.

Despite five centuries of change and growth since the Conquest, modem Cholultecans maintain many traditional practices, which exist within a vital fabric of local religious and cultural life. These traditional practices very likely have pre Hispanic roots, including a ten-year cycle, called the "circular" of rotating citywide religious duties among the various neighborhoods. They continue today

There are religious festivals of one kind or another almost all year round somewhere in the Cholula area. Social life within and among the various neighborhoods is organized around these religious events, as well as traditions involving communal labor and commercial patterns. People and entire neighborhood rotate certain religious and ceremonial duties, which are called cargas. Many revolve around neighborhood and other local patron saints. These festivals require much work, money and organization. For example, during major festivals, the church of San Andres is richly decorated in flowers, and there are sand paintings called carpets on the ground in Biblical designs. During the week-long feast of Saint Andrew, there is also folk ballet, musical performances and firework shows at night. The most important festival in any of the neighborhood is that of the patron saint. The night before the church is decorated with lamps and then fireworks are set off to announce the event. The next day, Las Mañanitas is sung to the image, there are a number of Masses and it is possible to receive a "visit" by the image of another saint from another neighborhood. During one of the Masses, the carga is transferred to a new mayordomo or person in charge, which is usually attended by mayordomos from other neighborhoods. After this mass, food is offered to all in attendance.

Cargas generally last for one year and start small, such as being in charge of cleaning the neighborhood church, collecting alms and acting as a go-between for the priest and parishioners. However, most involve the sponsorship of the many religious festivals that take place in the city. This system is one of the more complex of its type in the world. Receiving a carga gives the person, called a mayordomo, prestige from the community since he is considered to be working for the common good. Mayordomos can be men, women and even children. The most prestigious carga is to be the mayordomo of the neighborhood's patron saint. This mayordomo receives a certain amount of authority and even a silver scepter along with physical possession of the image. The wives of these mayordomos, carry silver baskets. Even more prestigious than this is to be a mayordomo of a citywide festival which is organized among the neighborhoods. These include the festival of the Virgin of the Remedies, the Fiesta del Pueblo, and events related to Holy Week.

=== Important festivals ===
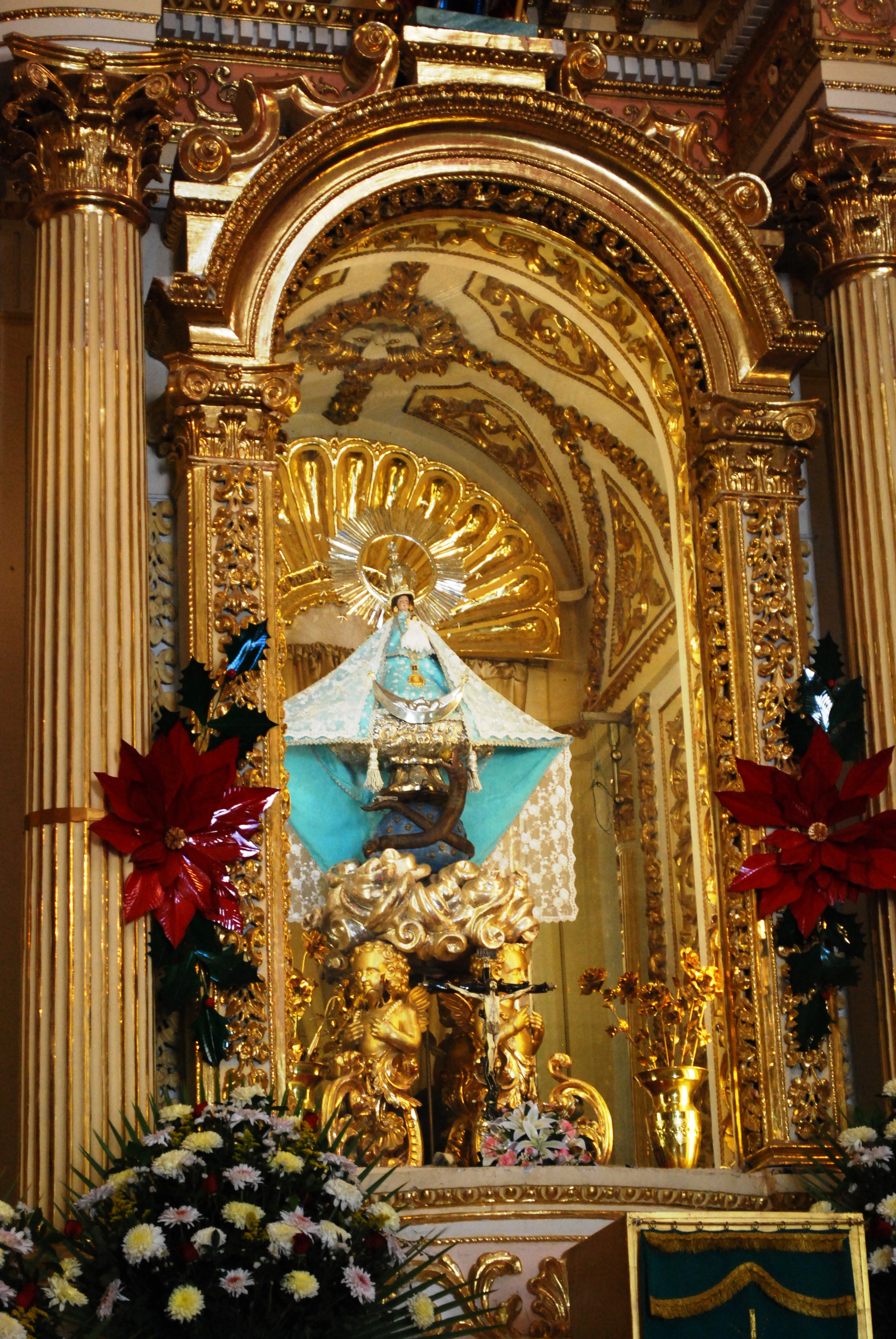
Image of the Virgin of the Remedies at the church

The most important festival period in Cholula extends from 31 August to the middle of September, which revolves around the patron saint of the city, the Virgin of the Remedies. On the night of August 31, there is the Procesión de los Faroles ('Procession of the Lamps'). It begins with a procession around the streets of the city, with each neighborhood carrying an image of its patron saint. At 9pm, the procession arrives to San Gabriel friary to sing and pray during what is called the hora santa ('holy hour'). The night ends at the Nuestra Señora de los Remedios church on top of the pyramid with Mass and the singing of Las Mañanitas to the Virgin. This tradition is recent, being only about twenty years old.

The feast of the Virgin of the Remedies officially begins on September 1 and lasts for about a week. The events of the week lead up to September 8, which is the Virgin's day, which commemorates her appearance in the city. Events include indigenous dancing such as the Concheros performed in the atrium and other locations, and pilgrims bring offerings to the image. In the afternoon, there is a burning of images called panzones. A panzon is an effigy made of crêpe paper with fireworks in its belly. Panzon means "large belly." This effigy is burned, with the fireworks going off last. After it is burned, it is taken to the neighborhood which is charged with the creation of a new one the following year.

After the veneration of the image, visitors gather in the Concordia Plaza for the "trueque" (trade), to exchange and sell goods, a tradition from the pre-Hispanic period. Common items include cheese from Chiautla, fresh and dried herbs (both culinary and medicinal), ocote wood, incense, nuts, fruits from various parts of Puebla state, resins, mecapales, vanilla pods, saffron, peanuts, and crafts such as palm frond mats (petates), baskets, clay pots and wooden utensils. While September 8 is considered to be the date of the Virgin's first appearance in Cholula, the date is also related to Chiconauhquiauhitl (goddess of nine rains) who was worshiped at the top of this pyramid at the end of the pre-Hispanic period. The Spanish replaced this image with that of the Virgin of the Remedies. Very early on 8 September, residents and pilgrims come to the pyramid and sanctuary to sing "Las mañanitas" and carrying paper lamps. This is the most important religious event in the city, with events related to it on almost every block. This event brings in people from all parts of the city and from many parts of the region. One tradition associated with this is the exchange of small gifts among the strangers in the crowd. Traditional dress is usually worn only for this event. For women, this includes a black or dark blue skirt, with trim in magenta, or emerald green, a wrap belt tied on the hip, a blouse embroidered with flowers, a rebozo or neckerchief, with earrings and a cross of silver. Men wear loose pants and shirts of natural cotton cloth, huaraches, a wrap belt with one end hanging loose in front, and wool shoulder wrap decorated with geometric designs and a palm frond hat. Concurrent with the feast of the Virgin from the 1 to the 16th of September is the regional fair. The trueque, while still practiced in its original form, has also evolved into this regional fair, called the Feria de Cholula. It features local food and music, culminating on Mexico's Independence Day.

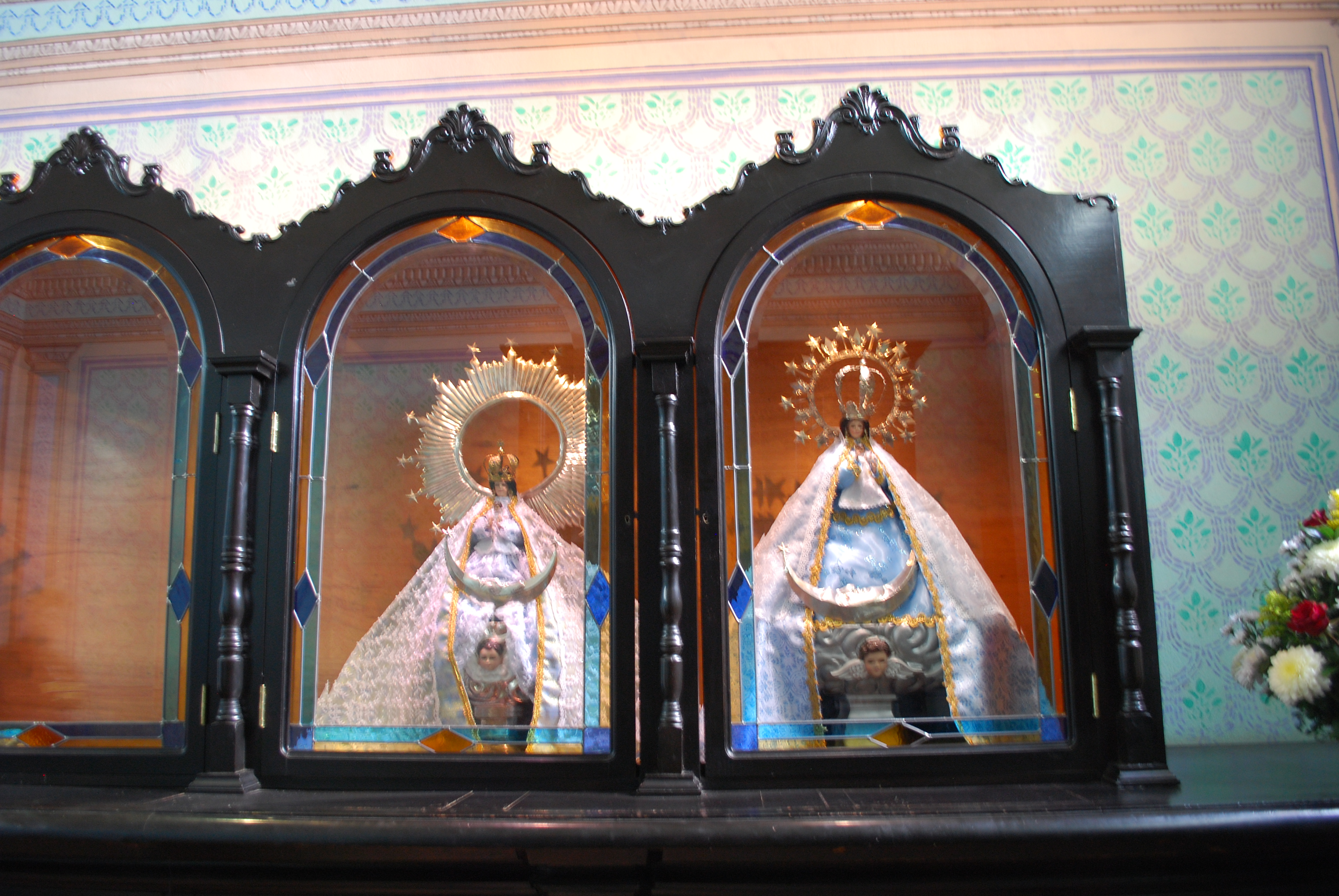
"Sister" images to the Virgin of the Remedies

The next most important citywide event is called the Bajada de la Virgen, which also involves the Virgin of the Remedies. This time, instead of the masses climbing the pyramid to honor her, she comes down for two weeks in May or June to visit the various neighborhoods and surrounding rural communities. The tradition of bringing down the image from the pyramid began in 1825. The next occurred in 1870 and the third in 1890. Today, it is an annual event, but it is not the original image which leaves, rather it is a substitute. The reason for this is that the processions take a toll on the ancient image. The replicas of the image are considered to be "sisters" to the original, with the impression that it is the idea of the Virgin which is important, not the physical image. The last time the original image left the church was in 1999, due to the earthquake. It was kept at the friary of San Gabriel until it could be returned after repairs. During the Bajada, the image is carried through the streets in some portion of the city every morning, which has been prepared with elaborate gateways of flowers, and more decorating the route. When the image comes down off the pyramid, she travels through all ten neighborhoods three times in an event called the circulares. Each circulare is dedicated to a different saint, and presided over by a mayordomo. Each neighborhood sponsors one of the circulares every ten years, providing food and drink, incense and other necessities for the rite. She descends again on August 11, all the way to the town of San Luis Tehuiloyocan. These acts of "popular" piety may be hard to some to understand; these practices trace back to almost 500 years, with the arrival of the first Franciscan friars and the original "religious" purpose may have become shrouded with the cultural aspects of these celebrations over the years

Like a number of other cities in the area, such as Huejotzingo, Cholula celebrates Carnival, this tradition began over 90 years ago, with events centered on the main square of the city. The principal dancers of this event are called the Huehues, which means "ancient ones" in Nahuatl. Overall, the event has the participation of over 3,000 dancers from the various neighborhoods as well as from other parts of Puebla and Tlaxcala states. This is one of the events which brings in crowds from Puebla city, Mexico City and surrounding towns, crowding the streets.

The Quetzalcóatl Ritual is celebrated on the spring equinox and is similar to other spring equinox rituals held on other pyramids in Mexico, such as Teotihuacan. There is indigenous dancing in the Patio of the Altars and the greeting of the sun on that morning.

Concierto para Campanas (Bell Concert) also called the Vaniloquio is an event when most of the city's thirty seven churches coordinate their ringing to music written by Llorenc Barber especially for the purpose. The concert involves more than 150 bells, rung by 130 people. The most important day for this event is 28 November, but it also occurs on the Sunday after Ash Wednesday. Three rockets fired from the center of the city signals the beginning. The city recommends that listeners climb onto a rooftop or the Pyramid or wander the streets to hear the concert best. The concert is proceeded by Aztec dance in the main square, as well as a cheese, bread and wine tasting event.

There are numerous events associated with Lent and Holy Week, some of which bring in large number of visitors into the city. The Tlahuanca is an event held on the fourth Monday of Lent at the Capilla Real. Originally, it was a festival held on the street, involving drinking to excess. The name comes from the word tlāhuānqui, which means drunk. Today, it is a procession inside the Capilla Real in which wooden crosses are handed out and a host offers food to visitors. To commemorate the death of the Virgin Mary, sawdust carpets dyed in various colors, flowers and plant matter is arranged in patterns on the ground to form what are called Las Alfombras or 'carpets'. It is also done during the night before Good Friday for the Stations of the Cross procession that passes by a number of the churches on various streets in the city. The Altepeilhuitl is an event that takes place on the Sunday before the Thursday marking the ascension of Christ at the Capilla Real. Here images of towns' and neighborhoods' patron saints are adorned with fruit, squash, chili peppers, corn and bread and presented. This tradition dates back into the colonial period.

In May, there is the Fiesta de Pobres and Labradores ('Festival of the Poor and Laborers'). It is also known as the Feast of the Holy Trinity. It lasts approximately one month between the months of May and June. Merchants, woodworkers, general laborers, farm workers and flower growers participate in this feast. The festival also has in attendance one of the "sister" images of the Virgin of the Remedies brought down from the sanctuary at the top of the pyramid. Another event dedicated to the common people is the festival of Isidore the Laborer, when farm workers form a parade with their agricultural machines decorated with flowers.

There is also a number of fairs dedicated to local products. The Feria del Nopal ('Nopal Cactus Fair') in San Bernardino Tlaxcalanzingo celebrates the main crop grown in the municipality. It occurs during the first week of June. The Feria del Queso ('Cheese Fair') is held in Santa Maria Tonantzintla and is held in honor of the Virgin of the Conception. There is an exposition and sale of local cheeses at the main plaza of the municipality on the first weekend of August. There is also an annual festival dedicated to bread in which an enormous brick oven is constructed on the main plaza and local bread makers demonstrate traditional techniques. Over 150 types of bread are exhibited and sold during the event.

Events related to Day of the Dead in Cholula extend over five days, and are based on rites from the pre-Hispanic period. The first day is 28 October, when a flower-covered cross is placed on homes to welcome deceased loved ones. The souls that arrive on this date are those who died in accidents. On the 29th, those who died from drowning or suffocation arrive. On the 30th, it is the souls of deceased children in limbo, and on the 31st other children. The first and second are for adults. As in other parts of Mexico, the dead are received through large altars placed in homes, filled with the food and drink they enjoyed in life as well as flowers and other decorations.

Between these major events, there are numerous patron saint's days for all the neighborhoods and other communities of the two municipalities of San Pedro and San Andrés. Many of these events include amusement rides, fireworks, cockfights, horse races, elaborate decoration of the church the event is centered on, folk and indigenous dancing, and more. For a number of these, one of the images of the Virgin of the Remedies will also "visit."

== History ==
=== Pre-Hispanic period ===
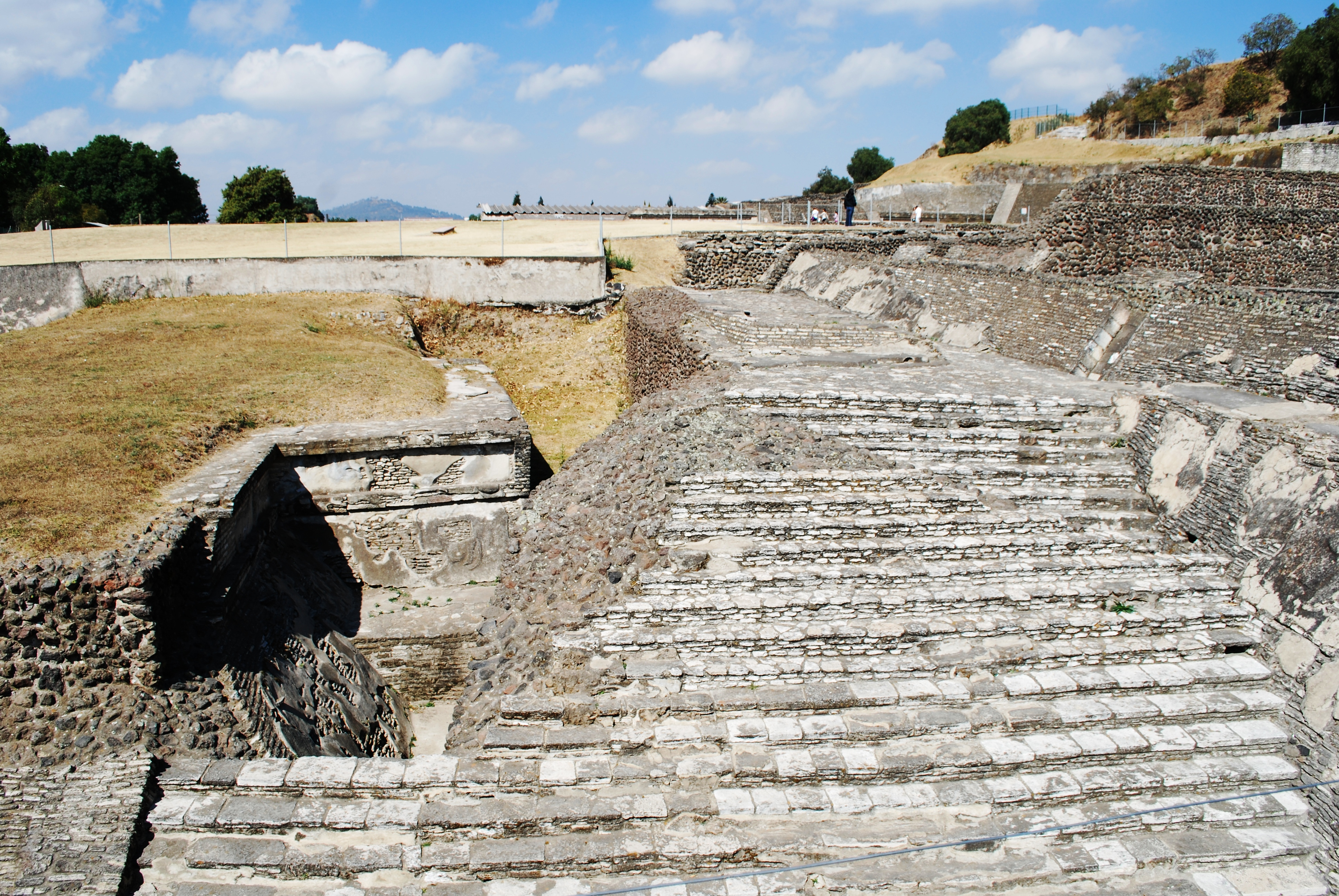
The "Teotihuacan" building at the pyramid archeological site

The name of Cholula comes from the Nahuatl word (Nahuatl languages: Cholōllān). Its etymology has been explained either as "where water falls," or "place of those who fled" or a combination of the two. "Place of those who fled" is a reference to a myth that describes the arrival of Toltec refugees to this area because of the fall of Tula in 1000 CE. One Mexica myth states that the people of Cholula, called Chololtecs, were descended from one of the seven Aztec tribes that migrated to central Mexico from their mythical homeland Aztlan.

Settlement of Cholula began between 500 and 200 BCE (middle Pre Classic period), with two small villages established near water sources in what is now the eastern side of the city. They were two of a number of agricultural villages with ceremonial centers in the area, with evidence of emerging social stratification. Its earliest settlers were probably speakers of Oto-Manguean languages, linguist Terrence Kaufman has proposed that they were speakers of the Chorotega language of the Mangue branch of the oto-mangue family. The various small rivers and streams allowed for irrigated agriculture and at one time, several converged into a shallow lake, which may have been used for chinampas. At the end of the Pre-classic, many other settlements in the area were abandoned but Cholula grew, possibly with migration from these other settlements. This made Cholula the dominant political force in the region. This was also the time when work on the Great Pyramid began, along with another monument called the Edificio Rojo. Cholula continued to grow during the Classic period (200–800 CE) to an extension of over 2 square kilometres (0.77 mi^{2}) and a population of between 20,000 and 25,000. It also remained dominant over the Puebla-Tlaxcala region, with more monumental construction, including the addition of two stages to the Great Pyramid.

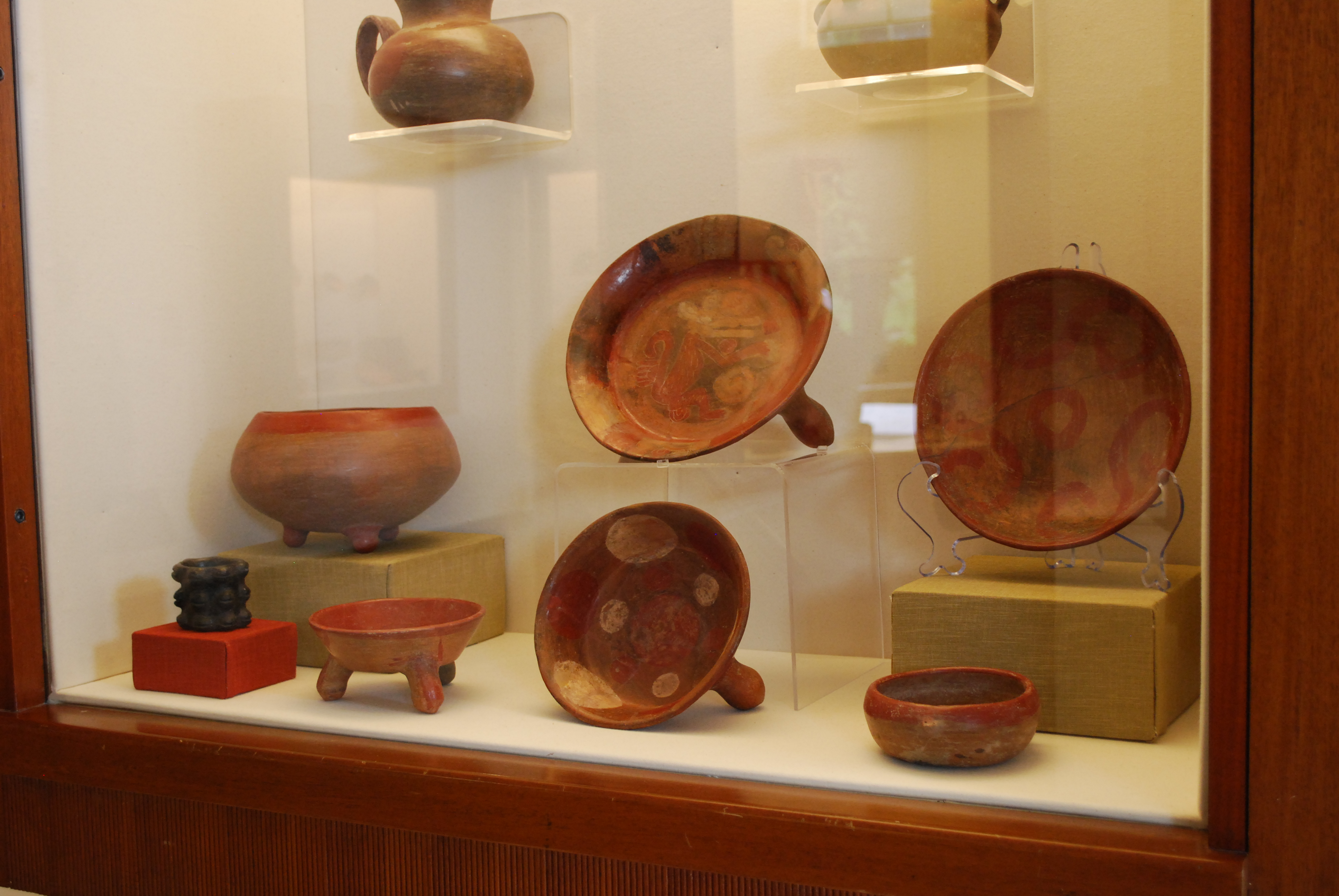
Ceramics displayed at the Pyramid site museum

During this time period, there is also evidence of influence from the larger Teotihuacan in the Valley of Mexico. However, the exact nature of the relationship between the two cities is not entirely known. One stage of the Great Pyramid is done in talud-tablero architecture, similar to that of Teotihuacan, but the next stage uses a different style, with stairs leading to the top on all four sides. The stage after this one, built during the decline of Teotihuacan, again returns to talud-tablero. Pottery styles between the two cities are similar, especially in the early Classic period, but living spaces and some religious iconography was different. When Teotihuacan declined, Cholula also suffered a significant population decline. At this time, the area took part in the Epi-classic central Mexican culture, and the iconography changes to show Gulf coast influence. Religious focus was kept on the Great Pyramid, but added its own layers to the work.

In the 12th century, Nahua peoples migrated to the Valley of Puebla after the fall of Tula. Eventually, this group was able to displace the Oto-mangue speakers as the ruling class, pushing them to the area south of the Great Pyramid. Kaufman has proposed that the displacement of Mangue speakers to southern Mesoamerica happened at this point. However, the remaining in this area retained a certain amount of political autonomy, which would create division in the city that remains to this day. The new lords, calling themselves the Chololtecs, shifted religious focus away from the Great Pyramid and to a new temple constructed to Quetzalcoatl. As part of this shift, some of the final construction phases of the Pyramid were destroyed. However, the Chololtecs would face continued hostilities from the previous inhabitants who dominated settlements around the city.

In the Post-classic period, Cholula (900–1521) grew to its largest size and returned to its status as a regionally dominant city. The city's location was strategic, on the trade routes between the Valley of Mexico, the Valley of Oaxaca and the Gulf of Mexico, making it a major mercantile center. A variant of an artistic style and iconography, especially in pottery, spread from Cholula to Culhuacán in and other areas in the Valley of Mexico, then to other areas in Mesoamerica. This cultural trait is called Mixteca-Puebla and it was spread by the vast trading networks that existed in Mesoamerica at that time. The split between the ethnic divisions of the city eventually would coalesce into three areas by the late pre-Hispanic period, which are now known by the names of San Pedro Cholula, San Andrés Cholula and San Isabel Cholula. Only the first two are considered part of the city today.

=== Colonial period ===
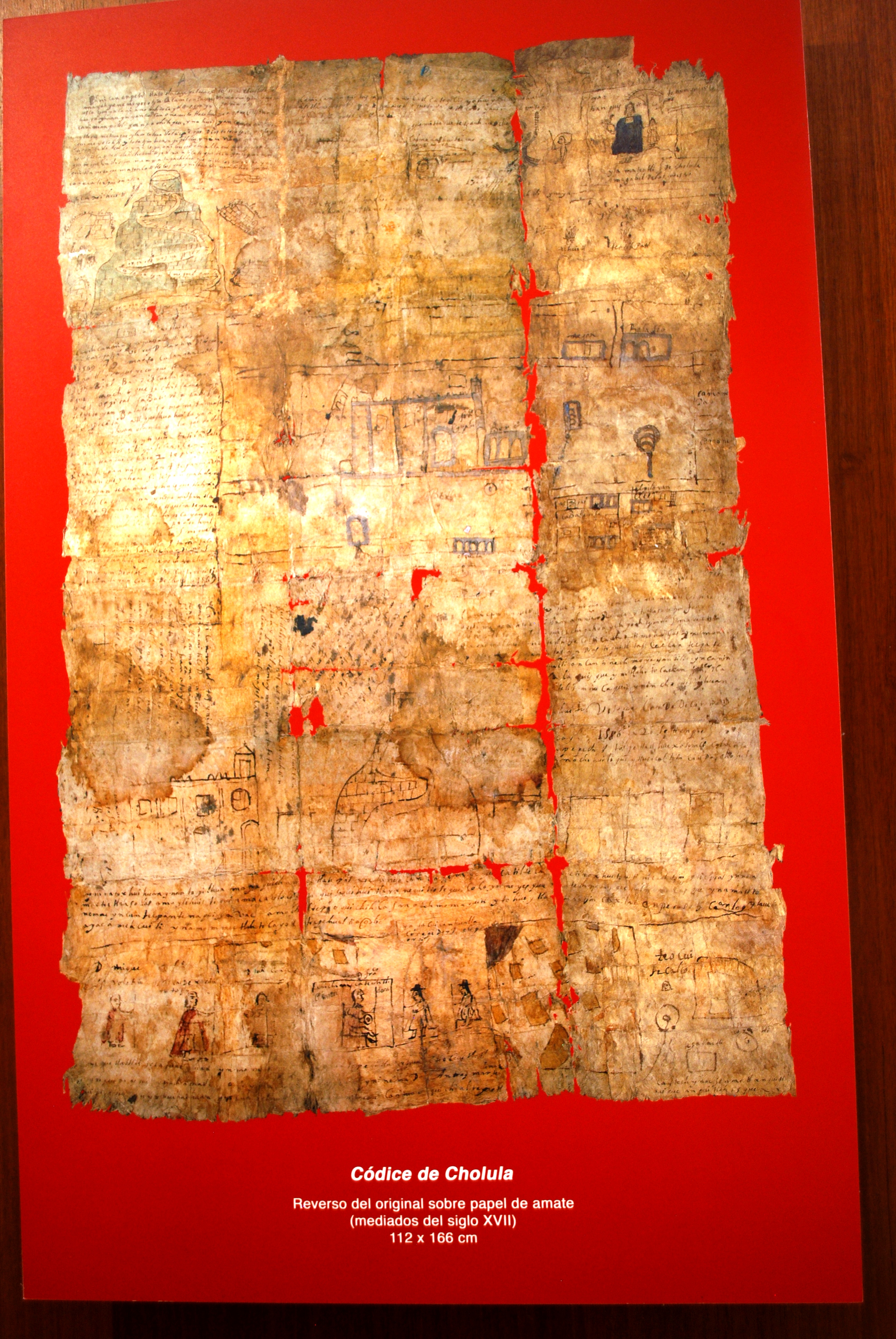
Cholula Codex on display at the Pyramid site museum.

By the time the Spanish arrived, Cholula was a major religious and mercantile center, with the Quetzalcoatl Temple one of the most important pilgrimage sites in the central Mexican highlands. Hernán Cortés estimated that the city had 430 temples and about 20,000 homes in the center of the city with another 20,000 on the periphery. Cortés was attracted to the pastureland of the valley area, but while there was a great deal of irrigated farms, the city had a population of about 100,000 and overpopulation meant that many poor people often lacked food.

Cortés had arrived to Cholula after the Spanish victory over the Tlaxcalans, and he was supposed to meet Moctezuma II here. Since Cholula was allied with the Aztecs, the Spanish and their new Tlaxcalan allies were suspicious of this arrangement. There are two accounts of what happened next. Spanish accounts tell of Cortés being warned through La Malinche of a plot to attack the Spanish. Cortés called the leaders of the city to the central square of the city where the Spanish were with their weapons. On signal, the Spanish charged and killed as many as 6,000 Chololtecs. However, the Aztec record states that the Spanish attack was unprovoked and there was no plot against them. The event is called the Cholula Massacre, and it resulted in many deaths and destruction of much of the city.

However, unlike many other pre-Hispanic cities, which were abandoned or destroyed before or immediately after the Conquest, Cholula has remained to this day. Nearby in the same valley the Spanish built the city of Puebla, which grew to prominence rapidly. Between this and an epidemic, which claimed much of its indigenous population, Cholula never recovered its former importance. The area was first divided into encomiendas, such as that of Andrés de Tapia who held the San Andrés portion. In 1531, the entire city became a "corregimiento" or area under direct control of the Spanish Crown.

Cholula was given the status of a city in 1535, and granted a coat of arms in 1540 by Charles V. Over the colonial period, forty seven churches were constructed in the city. However, the division of the city along ethnic lines, would impact itself again. In 1714, the San Andrés sector of the city, where most of the indigenous people lived, petitioned to be separated from the San Pedro sector to become an "Indian republic," and it was granted. This gave this part of the city limited autonomy.

=== Independence to the present ===
San Pedro and San Andrés were formed into two municipalities in the 1860s under the 1861 Puebla Constitution. The city that spans the two political entities was named the Distrito Cholula de Rivadavia in 1895 by the state in honor of Bernardino Rivadavia.

== Economy and tourism ==
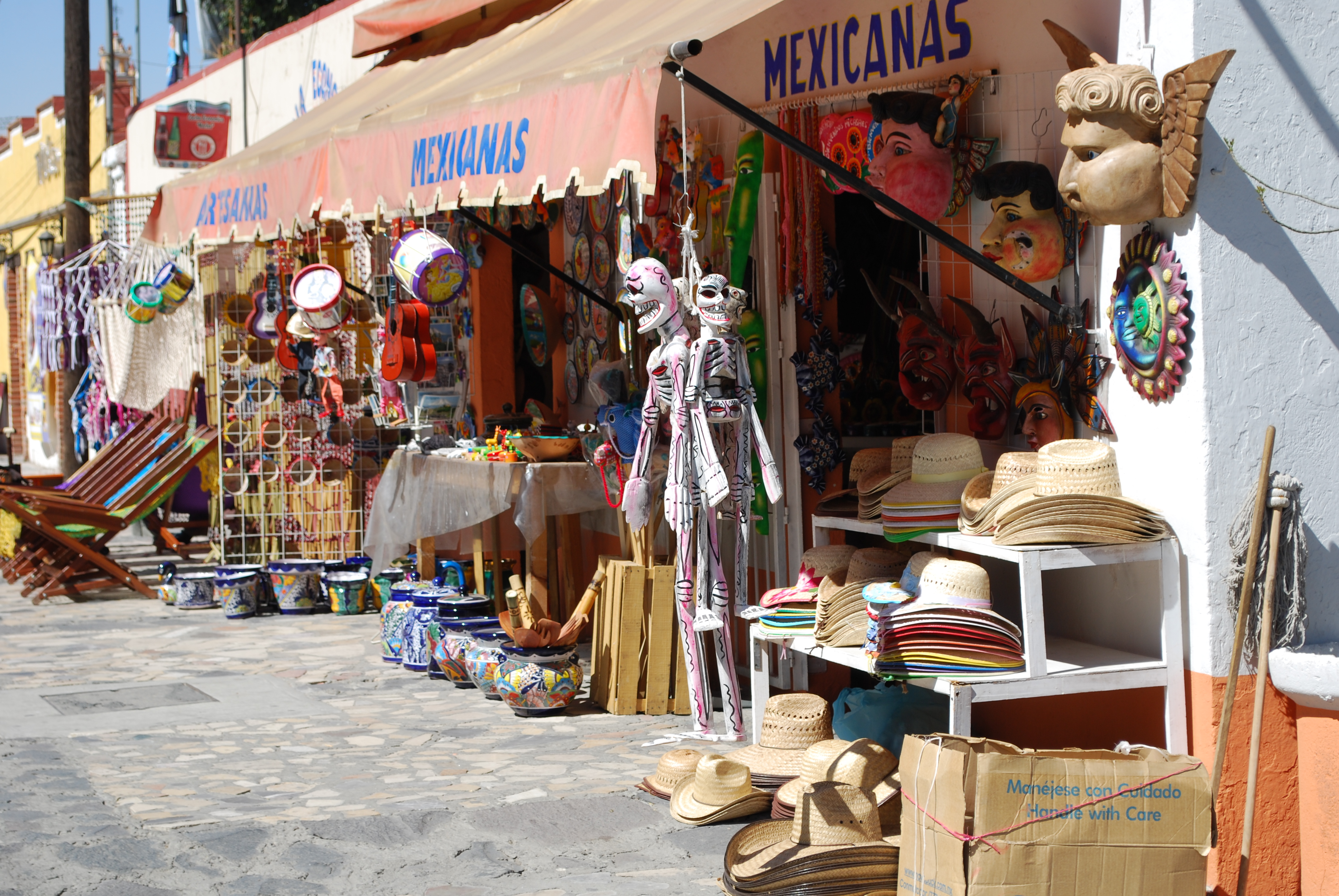
Craft and souvenirs for sale in Cholula

The main economic activities of the city are commerce and agriculture, although the economy is shifting away from agriculture. Commerce, including tourism, is mostly concentrated in the city proper, while agriculture and certain industries such as brick making, are mostly found in the edge of the city and in the rural areas of the municipalities of San Pedro Cholula and San Andrés Cholula. Despite being a city in its own right, Cholula is part of the Puebla metropolitan area, with residential areas encroaching onto former farmland.

Most of the San Pedro municipality is dedicated to agriculture, much of which is irrigated and represents most of the irrigated farmland in the Cholula area. Agriculture employs about 30% of the population of San Andrés, while it employs 17.4% of the population of San Pedro. Principal crops include corn, beans, alfalfa, animal feed, nopal cactus, onions, cilantro, radishes, cauliflower, cabbage, lettuce and cucumbers. There are also various fruits such as pears, plums, apricots, peaches, apples and capulins. There is also extensive floriculture. Livestock includes cattle, goats, pigs, and domestic fowl. In the San Andrés area, much of the livestock is produced for autoconsumption. There are small areas of pasture and some forest on the Tecajetes Mountain, with pine, oyamel and white cedar. Its production is second in important in the Valley of Puebla. Fishing is limited to a small pond called Zerezotla, which is stocked with carp and catfish.

Industry, mining and construction employs 39% of the population in San Pedro, and just under 30% in San Andrés. Industry in San Pedro includes the making of bricks, cinderblock and clay roof tiles, textiles, chemicals, metals, furniture, ceramics and glass. Most industry in San Andrés is related to the making of cheese and other dairy products, furniture and rustic ironwork. The entire area is involved in the making of hard apple cider as well.

Commerce, services and tourism employs 39% of the population of San Pedro and about 35% of the population of San Andrés. Tourism is based on the city's history, with the main tourist attractions are the Great Pyramid, topped by the Nuestra Señora de los Remedios church, the San Gabriel friary and colored towers of the total of thirty seven churches in the city. Images of this church on top of the pyramid with Popocateptl in the background are frequently used in Mexico's national promotion of tourism. It is one of the better known destinations in central Mexico for foreign travelers. Commercial activity is based on tourism, local and regional needs as well as the city's active nightlife, with that of San Andrés more gear to local and regional commerce than that of San Pedro.

== Geography ==
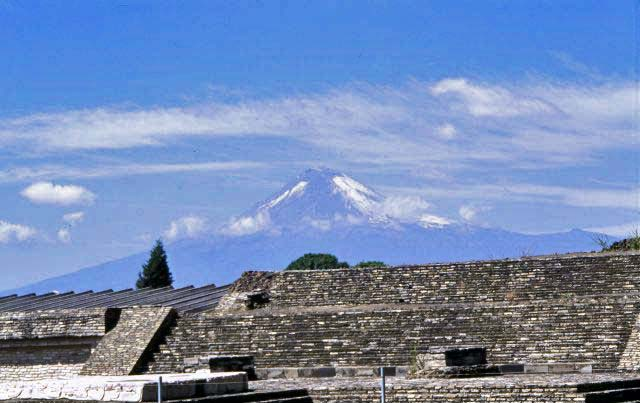
View of Popocatepetl from the archeological site

Cholula is located in the center west of the state of Puebla in the Valley of Puebla, 122 kilometres (76 mi) east of Mexico City and eight km west of Puebla. This valley is bordered by the Sierra Nevada to the west, the La Malinche volcano to the east, and extends over parts of the states of Puebla and Tlaxcala. The Cholula area extends over 111.03km2, which is divided politically into the municipality of San Andrés (61km2) and San Pedro (51.02km2). The Cholula area borders the municipalities of Juan C. Bonilla, Coronango, Cuautlancingo, San Gregorio Atzompa, Puebla, San Jerónimo Tecuanipan, Calpan and Ocoyucan.

The San Pedro municipality has twenty two communities outside the city; the largest of which are Almoloya, San Cosme Tezintla, Acuexcomac, San Cristóbal Tepontla, San Agustín Calvario, Zacapechpan, San Matías Cocoyotla, San Diego Cuachayotla, and San Francisco Cuapa. These communities primary economic activities are agriculture, floriculture and brick making. Other important communities of San Andrés outside the city include San Francisco Acatepec, San Antonio Cacalotepec, San Rafael Comac, San Luis Tehuiloyocan, San Bernardino Tlaxcalancingo and Santa Maria Tonanzintla.

The geography of the Cholula area is mostly flat with an average altitude of between 2,100 and 2,200 metres (6,900–7,200 ft) above sea level. There is a gentle descent from Northwest to Southeast along the Atoyac River. Apart from the Great Pyramid and some low hills in the towns of San Francisco Acatepec and Santa María Tonantzintla, the Zapotecas (2,377 metres, 7,799 ft) is the main elevation, located 3 kilometres (1.9 miles) West of the main square. One of the many legends about the Zapotecas tells of a man who made a pact with a demon in order to obtain money to sponsor a festival. The hill is a popular location for mountain biking and off-road motorcycles. Each year, there is a mountain biking event that begins from the main square of Cholula and extends for 50 kilometres (31 mi) through a number of small communities. San Andrés has a parasailing school, which trains beginners and organizes parasailing events which take place in the nearby Ocoyucan municipality.

=== Hydrography ===
The Valley of Puebla is an expanse of plains crossed by a number of small rivers, streams and arroyos, with the most significant being the Atoyac River. The Atoyac River has its beginning in the runoff of both the Iztaccíhuatl and Popocatepetl volcanoes. Cholula is located in the river's upper basin. This river passes through the San Pedro area and forms part of the border between San Andrés and the city of Puebla. There are also tributaries such as the Ametlapanapa, Zapatero and the Rabanillo and number of fresh water springs and seasonal arroyos.

=== Flora ===
The only forested area is an area associated with the Sierra del Tentzo, which contains oak forests and scrub. The rest of the area is either farmland or covered by human settlements.

=== Climate ===
The area has a temperate subtropical highland climate typical of South-Central Mexico, with an average temperature of between 18 and 20 °C (64 and 68 °F). January is the coldest month with average temperatures between 10 and 16 °C (50 and 61 °F), and May is the warmest with averages between 20 and 22 °C (68 and 72 °F). The 'high-sun' rainy season lasts from May to October and provides about 800 to 900 millimetres (31.5 to 35.4 in) of rainfall per year. These conditions are what made the area important agriculturally starting in the pre-Hispanic era.

== Demographics ==
The population of the Distrito Cholula de Rivadavia, or the city of Cholula was 118,170 as of 2005. This population divides into 35,206 on the San Andres side and 82,964 on the San Pedro side. The total population for the two municipalities, including the communities outside the city proper is 193,554 (80,118 for San Andres and 113,436 for San Pedro). there is an approximate population growth of about 3%. Almost all of the population identifies as Catholic with only between 3.5 and 4 percent identifying as Evangelical or Protestant. Most of the population of Cholula is mestizo; however, there are a number of indigenous families that live here, with more on the San Andrés side.

== Education ==
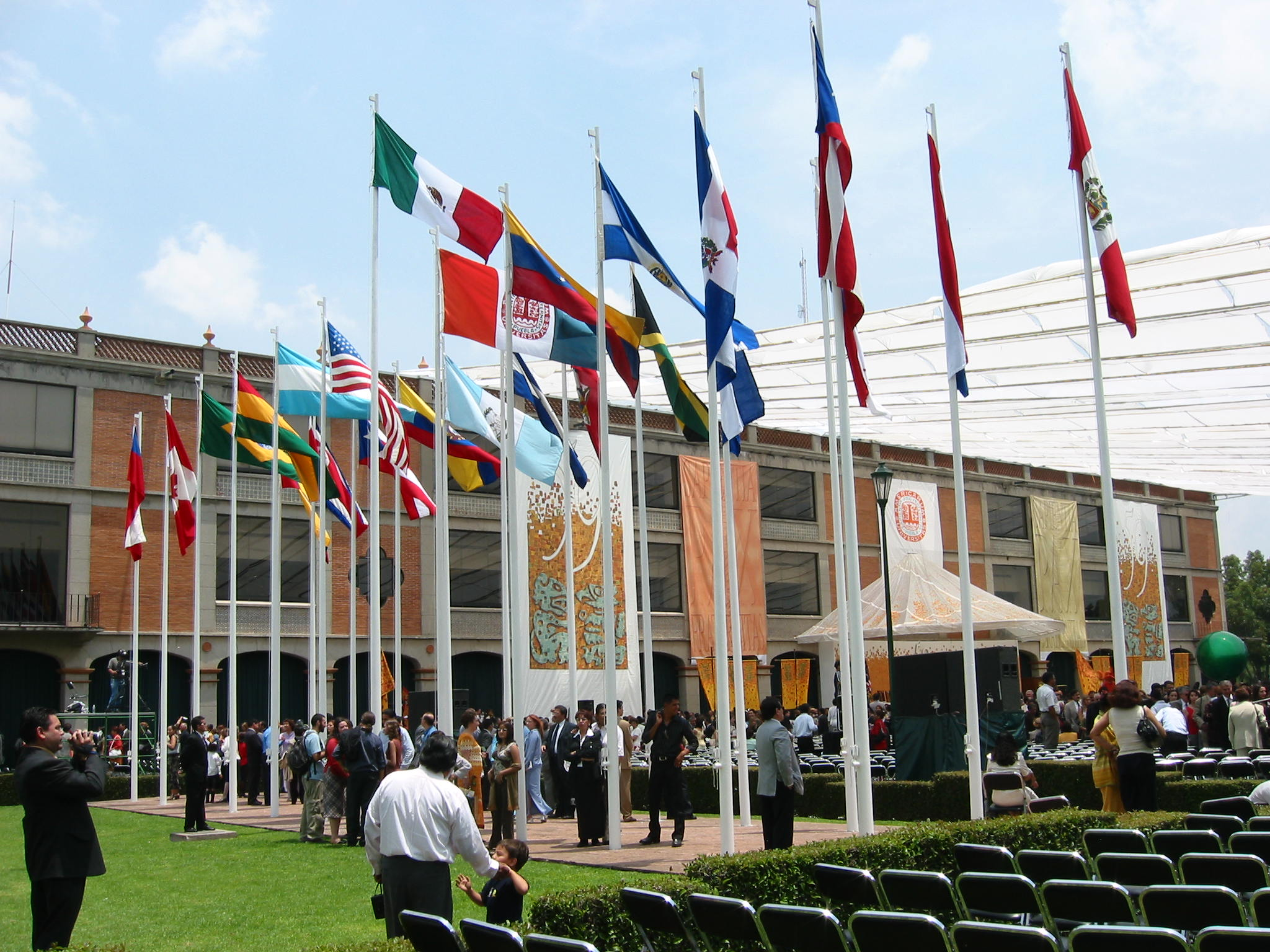
View of the main library of UDLAP

The Cholula area has fifty eight preschools, sixty nine primary schools, fifty four middle schools, sixteen high schools, six technical/professional schools above the high school level and an extension of the Universidad de las Américas. The larger percentage of schools is on the San Pedro side of the city.

The city is home to one major university, the private Universidad de las Américas Puebla, whose curriculum is modeled after Oxford and Harvard . UDLAP began as Mexico City College, located in Mexico City in 1940. In the 1960s, the school changed its name to the Universidad de las Américas. In the 1990s, the school split into two entities, which today are known as UDLAP and the Universidad de las Américas de la Ciudad de México (UDLA), which is located in Colonia Roma, Mexico City The school offers bachelor's, master's and doctorates in a number of majors, and is divided into five schools: Escuela de Ciencias, Escuelas de Negocios y Economía, Escuela de Artes y Humanidades, Escuela de Ingeniería and theEscuela de Ciencias Sociales. The UDLAP campus was established in 1970 on a campus filled with well-groomed gardens and benches. Today, students and local can be found watching the school's basketball and American football teams, called the Aztecas, face other colleges at the Estadio Templo de Dolor. Cultural events generally take place at the main auditorium behind the library, which is home to the Cine Club Las Américas, where students present independent films. There are also two art galleries named Sala José Cuevas and Sala Bertha Cuevas, which host temporary exhibits. The large school which faces and dominates the town square is part of the San Gabriel Friary complex, Instituto Garcia de Cisneros, named after one the original 12 Franciscans to arrive to the Americas, is PK–12 Catholic school run by the Franciscan friars.

== Transportation ==
The city is served by an intercity bus station run by Estrella Roja; it was previously served by the Puebla–Cholula Tourist Train, which connected it with the city of Puebla. There are also more local busses between Cholula and the city of Puebla run by Super Rápidos. There are also numerous "colectivos" or collective taxis and mini vans connecting with more local destinations.

== See also ==
- List of Mesoamerican pyramids

== Bibliography ==
- Cordero Vazquez, Donato (2000). Virgen de los Remedios en Cholula [Virgin of the Remedies in Cholula] (in Spanish). Puebla, Mexico: Media IV Impresion Visual. ISBN 978-970-94806-6-5.
- Link to tables of population data from Census of 2005 INEGI: Instituto Nacional de Estadística, Geografía e Informática
- Puebla Enciclopedia de los Municipios de México
