= Cholula =

Cholula may refer to:

== Places ==
- Cholula (Mesoamerican site), a pre-Columbian archaeological site in central Mexico, significant political center in the Classic and Postclassic eras of Mesoamerican chronology
  - Great Pyramid of Cholula, the pyramid-temple complex situated at the pre-Columbian site
- Cholula, Puebla, the modern-day city in Puebla state, Mexico, formal name Cholula de Rivadavia
- San Andrés Cholula, modern-day Mexican municipio (municipality), part of the conurbation of the city of Puebla
- San Pedro Cholula, modern-day Mexican municipio (municipality), part of the conurbation of the city of Puebla
- Santa Isabel Cholula, modern-day Mexican municipio (municipality), largely rural adjoining the conurbation of the city of Puebla

== Biology ==
- Cholula (bug), A genus of seed bugs native to the Western Hemisphere

== Products ==
- Cholula Hot Sauce, commercial brand of chili-based sauce manufactured in Jalisco, Mexico
