= List of Upsilon Pi Epsilon chapters =

Upsilon Pi Epsilon is an International honor society for computing and information disciplines. In the following list of chapters, active chapters are indicated in bold and inactive chapters and institutions are in italics.

Chapter	Charter date and range	Institution	Location	Status	Ref.
Alpha of Texas	January 1967	Texas A&M University	College Station, Texas	Active	
Alpha of Pennsylvania	December 1969	Pennsylvania State University	State College, Pennsylvania	Active	
	1973	Missouri University of Science and Technology	Rolla, Missouri	Active	
Alpha of Nebraska	1973–xxxx ?; 2008	University of Nebraska–Lincoln	Lincoln, Nebraska	Active	
Alpha of Massachusetts	1974	Worcester Polytechnic Institute	Worcester, Massachusetts	Active	
Alpha of Mississippi	April 29, 1974	University of Mississippi	University, Mississippi	Active	
	1980	Iona College	New Rochelle, New York	Active	
Alpha of South Carolina	1981	Clemson University	Clemson, South Carolina	Active	
Gamma of Pennsylvania	1985	University of Scranton	Scranton, Pennsylvania	Active	
Beta of Virginia	1988	Radford University	Radford, Virginia	Active	
Gamma of New Jersey	May 1988	William Paterson University	Wayne, New Jersey	Active	
Delta of New Jersey	December 1988	The College of New Jersey	Ewing Township, New Jersey	Active	
Epsilon of Pennsylvania	1989	Drexel University	Philadelphia, Pennsylvania	Active	
Lambda of California	1990	Santa Clara University	Santa Clara, California	Active	
Delta of Connecticut	1990	University of Bridgeport	Bridgeport, Connecticut	Active	
Beta of Maryland	1991	Towson University	Towson, Maryland	Active	
Zeta of Florida	1992	Florida Institute of Technology	Melbourne, Florida	Active	
Gamma of North Carolina	1993	North Carolina A&T State University	Greensboro, North Carolina	Active	
Alpha of Washington, D.C.	1994	American University	Washington, D.C.	Active	
Delta of Tennessee	1994	Middle Tennessee State University	Murfreesboro, Tennessee	Active	
Delta of Michigan	1994	Michigan State University	East Lansing, Michigan	Active	
Gamma of Maryland	1991	University of Maryland, Baltimore County	Catonsville, Maryland	Active	
Epsilon of North Carolina	1996	Wake Forest University	Winston-Salem, North Carolina	Active	
Mu of New York	May 28, 1997	Queens College, City University of New York	Flushing, Queens, New York City, New York	Active	
	1998	Northeastern University	Boston, Massachusetts	Active	
Zeta of Alabama	October 21, 1998	Tuskegee University	Tuskegee, Alabama	Active	
Gamma of Illinois	January 2000	Illinois Wesleyan University	Bloomington, Illinois	Active	
Zeta of Virginia	May 3, 2001	James Madison University	Harrisonburg, Virginia	Active	
Beta of Colorado	2001	Colorado State University	Fort Collins, Colorado	Active	
Eta of Georgia	2001	Georgia Southwestern State University	Americus, Georgia	Active	
Beta of Wisconsin	2001	Marquette University	Milwaukee, Wisconsin	Active	
Eta of Maryland	2001	University of Maryland, College Park	College Park, Maryland	Active	
	April 2002	University of Northern Iowa	Cedar Falls, Iowa	Active	
Delta of Illinois	2003	DePaul University	Chicago, Illinois	Active	
	2003	Ithaca College	Ithaca, New York	Active	
Theta of Ohio	April 17, 2004	Baldwin Wallace University	Berea, Ohio	Active	
Gamma of Colorado	2004	Colorado Mesa University	Grand Junction, Colorado	Active	
Beta of Washington, D.C.	2004	Howard University	Washington, D.C.	Active	
	2004	University of Missouri–Kansas City	Kansas City, Missouri	Active	
Zeta of Alabama	2006	Jacksonville State University	Jacksonville, Alabama	Active	
	2007	Sacred Heart University	Fairfield, Connecticut	Active	
	2010	Saint Peter's University	Jersey City, New Jersey	Active	
Alpha of Rhode Island	2011	Rhode Island College	Providence, Rhode Island	Active	
	2011	South Carolina State University	Orangeburg, South Carolina	Active	
Epsilon of Tennessee	October 5, 2012	Lipscomb University	Nashville, Tennessee	Active	
Alpha of Czech	January 2013	Czech Technical University in Prague	Prague, Czech Republic	Active	
	2015	Kennesaw State University	Cobb County, Georgia	Active	
	c. 2015	Illinois Institute of Technology	Chicago, Illinois	Active	
	April 14, 2017	Salisbury University	Salisbury, Maryland	Active	
Alpha of Montana	2017	Montana State University	Bozeman, Montana	Active	
Rho of Pennsylvania	2017	West Chester University	West Chester, Pennsylvania	Active	
	2017	West Texas A&M University	Canyon, Texas	Active	
Alpha of UAE	November 2017	American University of Sharjah	Sharjah, United Arab Emirates	Active	
Eta of Tennessee	2018	Rhodes College	Memphis, Tennessee	Active	
	2019	Catholic University of America	Washington, D.C.	Active	
	2019	Augusta University	Augusta, Georgia	Active	
Pi of Maryland	2019	Hood College	Frederick, Maryland	Active	
Beta of Rhode Island	2019	Johnson & Wales University	Providence, Rhode Island	Active	
	2019 (revived)	University of Maryland Eastern Shore	Princess Anne, Maryland	Active	
Sigma of Pennsylvania	2020	Penn State Harrisburg	Lower Swatara Township, Pennsylvania	Active	
	2020	Pennsylvania College of Technology	Williamsport, Pennsylvania	Active	
		Abilene Christian University	Abilene, Texas	Active	
		Adelphi University	Garden City, New York	Active	
		Arizona State University	Tempe, Arizona	Active	
		Arkansas State University	Jonesboro, Arkansas	Active	
		Ashland University	Ashland, Ohio	Active	
		Auburn University	Auburn, Alabama	Active	
Zeta of Tennessee		Austin Peay State University	Clarksville, Tennessee	Active	
		Baylor University	Waco, Texas	Active	
		Bethany College	Bethany, West Virginia	Active	
Iota of New York		Binghamton University	Binghamton, New York	Active	
		Boston University	Boston, Massachusetts	Active	
		Bridgewater State University	Bridgewater, Massachusetts	Active	
		Brigham Young University	Provo, Utah	Active	
		Brigham Young University–Hawaii	Lāʻie, Hawaii	Active	
		Brooklyn College	Brooklyn, New York City, New York	Active	
		Butler University	Indianapolis, Indiana	Active	
		California Polytechnic State University, San Luis Obispo	San Luis Obispo, California	Active	
		California State Polytechnic University, Pomona	Pomona, California	Active	
		California State University, Chico	Chico, California	Active	
		California State University, Fresno	Fresno, California	Active	
		California State University, Fullerton	Fullerton, California	Active	
		California State Polytechnic University, Humboldt	Arcata, California	Active	(Note: Chapter formed at Humboldt State University, now California State Polytechnic University, Humboldt.)
		California State University, Long Beach	Long Beach, California	Active	
		California State University, Los Angeles	Los Angeles, California	Active	
		California State University, Sacramento	Sacramento, California	Active	
		California State University, San Bernardino	San Bernardino, California	Active	
		Cameron University	Lawton, Oklahoma	Active	
		Capitol Technology University	South Laurel, Maryland	Active	
Alpha of Connecticut		Central Connecticut State University	New Britain, Connecticut	Active	
		Charleston Southern University	North Charleston, South Carolina	Active	
		Christopher Newport University	Newport News, Virginia	Active	
		Clarke University	Dubuque, Iowa	Active	
		Coastal Carolina University	Conway, South Carolina	Active	
		Colgate University	Hamilton, New York	Active	
		College of Charleston	Charleston, South Carolina	Active	
		Colorado State University Pueblo	Pueblo, Colorado	Active	
		Colorado Technical University	Colorado Springs, Colorado	Active	
		Columbia College	Columbia, Missouri	Active	
	19xx ?–1978; March 2024	Columbia University	New York City, New York	Active	
Eta of Michigan		Davenport University	Grand Rapids, Michigan	Active	
		De La Salle University	Manila, Philippines	Active	
		Denison University	Granville, Ohio	Active	
		DeSales University	Center Valley, Pennsylvania	Active	
		Dickinson College	Carlisle, Pennsylvania	Active	
		East Tennessee State University	Johnson City, Tennessee	Active	
Alpha of Connecticut		Eastern Connecticut State University	Willimantic, Connecticut	Active	
		Eastern Kentucky University	Richmond, Kentucky	Active	
		Eastern Washington University	Cheney, Washington	Inactive	
		Embry–Riddle Aeronautical University, Daytona Beach	Daytona Beach, Florida	Active	
		Excelsior University	Albany, New York	Active	
		Fairfield University	Fairfield, Connecticut	Active	
		Fairleigh Dickinson University	Florham Park, New Jersey	Active	
		Fairleigh Dickinson University	Teaneck, New Jersey	Active	
		Florida Atlantic University	Boca Raton, Florida	Active	
		Florida International University, Downtown Miami Center	Miami, Florida	Active	
		Florida Memorial University	Miami Gardens, Florida	Active	
		Florida State University	Tallahassee, Florida	Active	
		Francis Marion University	Florence, South Carolina	Active	
		Frostburg State University	Frostburg, Maryland	Active	
		Furman University	Greenville, South Carolina	Active	
		George Mason University	Fairfax, Virginia	Active	
		George Washington University	Washington, D.C.	Active	
Delta of Georgia		Georgia College & State University	Milledgeville, Georgia	Active	
		Georgia Gwinnett College	Lawrenceville, Georgia	Active	
		Georgia Tech	Atlanta, Georgia	Active	
		Georgia Southern University	Statesboro, Georgia	Active	
		Georgia Southern University–Armstrong Campus	Savannah, Georgia	Active	
		Georgia State University	Atlanta, Georgia	Inactive	
		Gonzaga University	Spokane, Washington	Active	
		Goucher College	Towson, Maryland	Active	
		Governors State University	University Park, Illinois	Active	
		Grand Valley State University	Allendale, Michigan	Active	
		Hampton University	Hampton, Virginia	Active	
		Hawaii Pacific University	Honolulu, Hawaii	Active	
		Hiroshima University	Hiroshima Prefecture, Japan	Active	
		Hofstra University	Hempstead, New York	Active	
		Illinois State University	Normal, Illinois	Active	
		Indiana University–Purdue University Fort Wayne	Fort Wayne, Indiana	Active	
		Iowa State University	Ames, Iowa	Active	
		Jacksonville University	Jacksonville, Florida	Active	
		John Carroll University	University Heights, Ohio	Active	
		Johns Hopkins University	Baltimore, Maryland	Active	
		Kansas State University	Manhattan, Kansas	Active	
		Kean University	Union, New Jersey	Active	
		Keene State College	Keene, New Hampshire	Active	
Epsilon of Michigan		Kettering University	Flint, Michigan	Active	
		La Salle University	Philadelphia, Pennsylvania	Active	
		Lafayette College	Easton, Pennsylvania	Active	
		Lamar University	Beaumont, Texas	Active	
		Lehigh University	Bethlehem, Pennsylvania	Active	
		Lenoir–Rhyne University	Hickory, North Carolina	Active	
		Lewis University	Romeoville, Illinois	Active	
		Longwood University	Farmville, Virginia	Active	
		Louisiana State University	Baton Rouge, Louisiana	Active	
		Louisiana State University Shreveport	Shreveport, Louisiana	Active	
		Louisiana Tech University	Ruston, Louisiana	Active	
		Loyola University Maryland	Baltimore, Maryland	Active	
		Macalester College	Saint Paul, Minnesota	Active	
		Marshall University	Huntington, West Virginia	Active	
		Marymount University	Arlington County, Virginia	Active	
		McKendree University	Lebanon, Illinois	Active	
		Mercer University	Macon, Georgia	Active	
		Metropolitan State University of Denver	Denver, Colorado	Active	
		Michigan Technological University	Houghton, Michigan	Active	
		Midwestern State University	Wichita Falls, Texas	Active	
		Millersville University of Pennsylvania	Millersville, Pennsylvania	Active	
		Missouri State University	Springfield, Missouri	Active	(Note: Chapter formed at Southwest Missouri State University, now called Missouri State University.)
		Monmouth University	West Long Branch, New Jersey	Active	
		Montclair State University	Montclair, New Jersey	Active	
		Morgan State University	Baltimore, Maryland	Active	
		Mount Saint Mary College	Newburgh, New York	Active	
		Mount St. Mary's University	Emmitsburg, Maryland	Active	
		New Jersey Institute of Technology	Newark, New Jersey		
		New York Institute of Technology	Old Westbury, New York	Active	
		Nicholls State University	Thibodaux, Louisiana	Active	
		Norfolk State University	Norfolk, Virginia	Active	
		North Carolina State University	Greensboro, North Carolina	Active	
		North Central College	Naperville, Illinois	Active	
		North Dakota State University	Fargo, North Dakota	Active	
		Northwest Missouri State University	Boston, Massachusetts	Active	
		Norwich University	Northfield, Vermont	Active	
		Nova Southeastern University	Fort Lauderdale, Florida	Active	
		Ohio Northern University	Ada, Ohio	Active	
		Ohio State University	Columbus, Ohio	Active	
		Ohio University	Athens, Ohio	Active	
		Oklahoma City University	Oklahoma City, Oklahoma	Active	
		Oregon State University	Corvallis, Oregon	Active	
		Østfold University College	Halden, Østfold, Norway	Active	
		Pace University-New York City	New York City, New York	Active	
		Pennsylvania Western University, Edinboro	Edinboro, Pennsylvania	Active	
		Prairie View A&M University	Prairie View, Texas	Active	
		Providence College	Providence, Rhode Island	Active	
		Purdue University	West Lafayette, Indiana	Active	
		Purdue University Fort Wayne	Fort Wayne, Indiana	Active	
		Rensselaer Polytechnic Institute	Troy, New York	Active	
		Roanoke College	Salem, Virginia	Active	
		Rollins College	Winter Park, Florida	Active	
		Rose–Hulman Institute of Technology	Terre Haute, Indiana	Active	
		Rowan University	Glassboro, New Jersey	Active	
		Rutgers University		Active	
		St. Cloud State University	St. Cloud, Minnesota	Active	
		Saint Joseph's University	Brooklyn, New York City, New York	Active	
		Saint Joseph's University	Philadelphia, Pennsylvania	Active	
		Saint Leo University	St. Leo, Florida	Active	
		Salem State University	Salem, Massachusetts	Active	
		San Diego State University	San Diego, California	Active	
		Shippensburg University of Pennsylvania	Shippensburg, Pennsylvania	Active	
		Siena College	Loudonville, New York	Active	
		Slippery Rock University	Slippery Rock, Pennsylvania	Active	
		South Dakota School of Mines and Technology	Rapid City, South Dakota	Active	
		South Dakota State University	Brookings, South Dakota	Active	
		Southeastern Louisiana University	Hammond, Louisiana	Inactive	
		Southern Methodist University	Dallas, Texas	Active	
		Southeast Missouri State University	Cape Girardeau, Missouri	Active	
		Southeastern Louisiana University	Hammond, Louisiana	Active	
		Southern Methodist University	Dallas, Texas	Active	
		Southern University	Baton Rouge, Louisiana		
		Southwestern University	Georgetown, Texas	Active	
		Spelman College	Atlanta, Georgia	Active	
		State University of New York at Oneonta	Oneonta, New York	Active	
		Stephen F. Austin State University	Nacogdoches, Texas	Active	
		Stevens Institute of Technology	Hoboken, New Jersey	Active	
		Stevenson University	Owings Mills, Maryland	Active	
		Stony Brook University	Stony Brook, New York	Active	
		Technical University of Varna	Varna, Bulgaria	Active	
		Temple University	Philadelphia, Pennsylvania	Active	
		Tennessee Tech	Cookeville, Tennessee	Active	
		Texas Christian University	Fort Worth, Texas	Active	
		Texas Tech University	Lubbock, Texas	Active	
		Trinity University	San Antonio, Texas	Active	
		Tulane University	New Orleans, Louisiana	Inactive	
		Union Adventist University	Lincoln, Nebraska	Active	
		United States Air Force Academy	El Paso County, Colorado	Active	
		United States Military Academy	West Point, New York	Active	
		United States Naval Academy	Annapolis, Maryland	Active	
		Universidad de las Américas Puebla	San Andrés Cholula, Mexico	Active	
		University of Alabama	Tuscaloosa, Alabama	Active	
		University of Alabama in Huntsville	Huntsville, Alabama	Active	
		University of Arizona	Tucson, Arizona	Active	
Nu of California		University of California, Berkeley	Berkeley, California	Active	
Beta of California		University of California, Los Angeles	Los Angeles, California	Active	
		University of Central Florida	Orlando, Florida	Active	
		University of Central Missouri	Warrensburg, Missouri	Active	
		University of Connecticut	Storrs, Connecticut	Active	
		University of Delaware	Newark, Delaware	Active	
		University of Florida	Gainesville, Florida	Active	
		University of Houston	Houston, Texas	Active	
		University of Illinois Chicago	Chicago, Illinois	Active	
		University of Illinois Springfield	Springfield, Illinois	Active	
		University of Kansas	Lawrence, Kansas	Active	
		University of Kentucky	Lexington, Kentucky	Active	
		University of Louisiana at Lafayette	Lafayette, Louisiana	Active	(Note: Chapter formed at the University of Southwestern Louisiana, now called the University of Louisiana at Lafayette.)
		University of Louisiana at Monroe	Monroe, Louisiana	Active	(Note: Chapter formed at the Northeast Louisiana University,, now known as the University of Louisiana at Monroe.)
		University of Louisville	Louisville, Kentucky	Active	
		University of Maine	Orono, Maine	Active	
		University of Mary Washington	Fredericksburg, Virginia	Active	
		University of Maryland Global Campus	Adelphi, Maryland	Active	
		University of Massachusetts Amherst	Amherst, Massachusetts	Active	
		University of Miami	Coral Gables, Florida	Active	
Iota of Michigan		University of Michigan	Ann Arbor, Michigan	Active	
		University of Michigan–Dearborn	Dearborn, Michigan	Active	
		University of Michigan–Flint	Flint, Michigan	Active	
		University of Missouri	Columbia, Missouri	Active	
		University of Nevada, Las Vegas	Paradise, Nevada	Active	
		University of New Hampshire	Durham, New Hampshire	Active	
		University of New Haven	West Haven, Connecticut	Active	
		New York University Tandon School of Engineering	Brooklyn, New York City, New York	Active	(Note: Chapter formed at the Polytechnic Institute of New York, now known as the University New York University Tandon School of Engineering.)
		University of North Carolina at Chapel Hill	Chapel Hill, North Carolina	Active	
		University of North Carolina at Greensboro	Greensboro, North Carolina	Active	
Beta of North Carolina	November 1982	University of North Carolina Wilmington	Wilmington, North Carolina	Active	
		University of North Dakota	Grand Forks, North Dakota	Active	
		University of North Florida	Jacksonville, Florida	Active	
		University of North Texas	Denton, Texas	Active	
		University of Notre Dame	Notre Dame, Indiana	Active	
		University of Oklahoma	Norman, Oklahoma	Active	
		University of Oregon	Eugene, Oregon	Active	
		University of Pittsburgh	Pittsburgh, Pennsylvania	Active	
		University of Puget Sound	Tacoma, Washington	Active	
		University of Richmond	Richmond, Virginia	Active	
		University of San Diego	San Diego, California	Active	
		University of San Francisco	San Francisco, California	Active	
		University of South Alabama	Mobile, Alabama	Active	
		University of South Carolina	Columbia, South Carolina	Active	
		University of South Dakota	Vermillion, South Dakota	Active	
		University of South Florida	Sarasota, Florida	Active	
		University of Southern California	Los Angeles, California	Active	
		University of Southern Mississippi	Hattiesburg, Mississippi	Active	
		University of Tennessee	Knoxville, Tennessee	Active	
		University of Tennessee at Chattanooga	Chattanooga, Tennessee	Active	
Gamma of Texas		University of Texas at Arlington	Arlington, Texas	Active	
		University of Texas at Austin	Austin, Texas	Active	
		University of Texas at El Paso	El Paso, Texas	Active	
		University of Texas at San Antonio	San Antonio, Texas	Active	
		University of Vermont	Burlington, Vermont	Active	
		University of Washington Tacoma	Tacoma, Washington	Active	
		University of Washington Bothell	Bothell, Washington	Active	
		University of West Alabama	Livingston, Alabama	Active	
		University of West Florida	Pensacola, Florida	Active	
		University of West Georgia	Carrollton, Georgia	Active	
		University of Wisconsin–La Crosse	La Crosse, Wisconsin	Active	
		University of Wyoming	Laramie, Wyoming	Active	
		Ursinus College	Collegeville, Pennsylvania	Active	
		Villanova University	Villanova, Pennsylvania	Active	
		Virginia State University	Petersburg, Virginia	Active	
		Virginia Tech	Blacksburg, Virginia	Active	
		Wagner College	Staten Island, New York	Active	
		Washington University in St. Louis	St. Louis, Missouri	Active	
		Wayne State College	Wayne, Nebraska	Active	
		West Virginia University	Morgantown, West Virginia	Active	
		Western Illinois University	Macomb, Illinois	Active	
		Western International University	Phoenix, Arizona	Inactive	(Note: The college closed in February 2019.)
		Western Kentucky University	Bowling Green, Kentucky	Active	
		Western Michigan University	Kalamazoo, Michigan	Active	
		Western New Mexico University	Silver City, New Mexico	Active	
		Westminster College	Fulton, Missouri	Active	
Beta of South Carolina		Winthrop University	Rock Hill, South Carolina	Active	
		Worcester State University	Worcester, Massachusetts	Active	
		Youngstown State University	Youngstown, Ohio	Active	
