= Sanatorio de Nuestra Señora de Guadalupe =

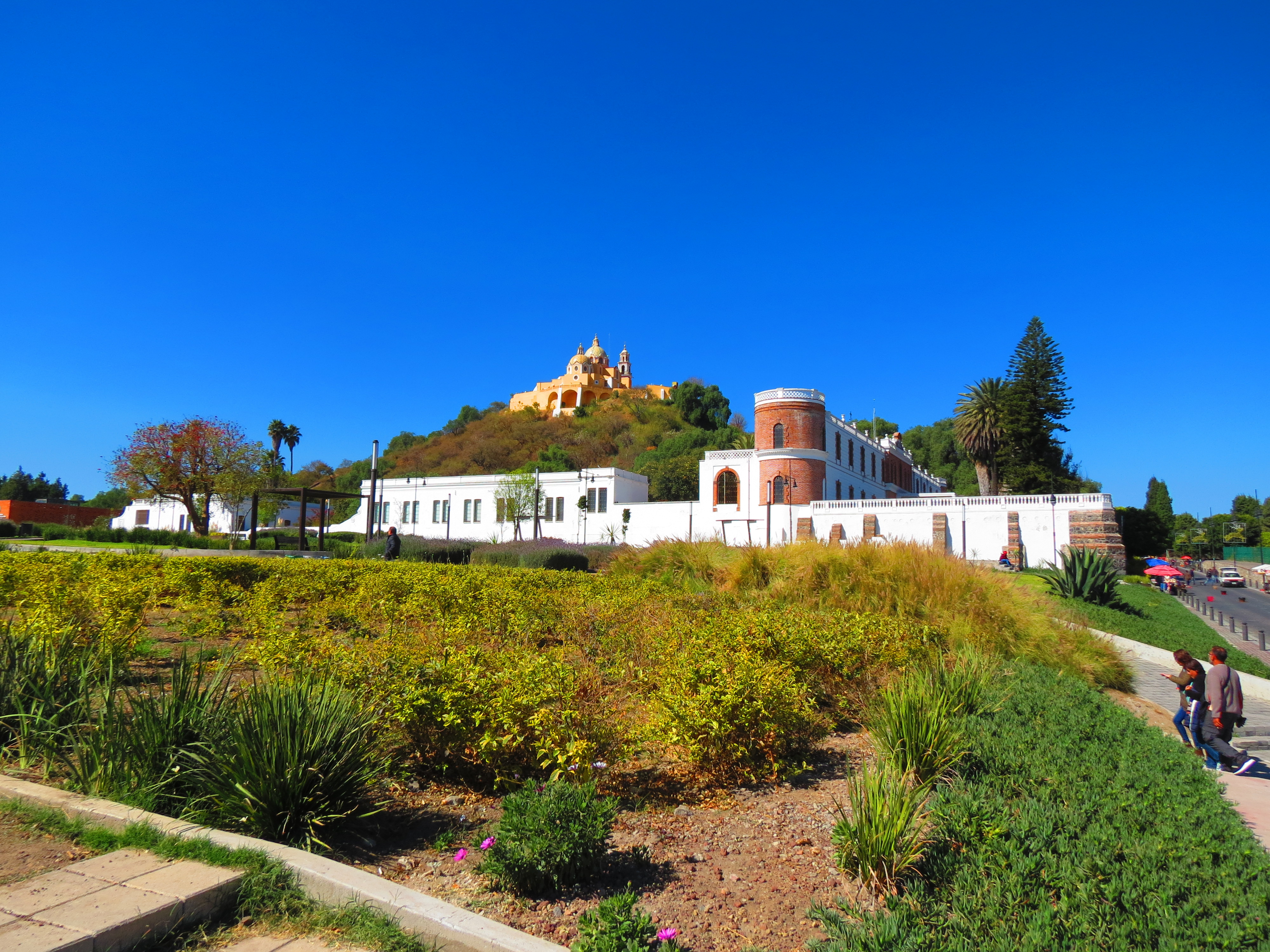

Geography
- Location: C. 14 Pte. 307, San Juan Aquiahuac, 72810 San Andrés Cholula, Puebla, Mexico
- Coordinates: 19.057758°N 98.300676°W

Organisation
- Type: psychiatric hospital

History
- Opened: 1910
- Closed: 2013

Links
- Lists: Hospitals in Mexico

Sanatorio de Nuestra Señora de Guadalupe (also known as, Hospital Psiquiátrico de Nuestra Señora de Guadalupe; currently, Regional Museum of Cholula) was a psychiatric hospital situated adjacent to the Great Pyramid of Cholula at the base of the Great Pyramid of Cholula, Tlachihualtepetl, in the municipality of San Andrés Cholula, Puebla, Mexico. It operated from 1910 to 2013.

== Founding ==
Founded in 1910, the sanatorium was the result of an agreement between Rita Canelo and the Hospitaller order of San Juan de Dios ("Juaninos"). The institution was established to care for Canelo's son who suffered from a mental illness. As there were no other psychiatric facilities in Puebla at the time, Canelo acquired land at the foot of Tlachihualtepetl to build the sanatorium.

The hospital was formally inaugurated with the blessing of Archbishop José Ramón Ibarra y González. It served as the first psychiatric institution in the state of Puebla for over a century.

The Juaninos originally provided care through prayer, physical activity, and meditative practices. Later, professional medical staff were added. Patients were largely self-sufficient, maintaining farms and orchards on the hospital grounds.

== Closure and conversion ==
The sanatorium faced challenges during periods of national crisis, including the Mexican Revolution and the Cristero War. With advancements in psychiatry and the development of new treatments, the need for institutionalization decreased. Consequently, the sanatorium closed in 2013.

The building was repurposed as the Regional Museum of Cholula.

== Architecture and grounds ==
The sanatorium's architecture reflected the late Porfirian era, incorporating French styles such as iron windows, Catalan vaults, and extensive gardens. Over time, eight pavilions were added to the complex, funded by donations. The structure was enclosed by thick adobe walls and integrated into the base of the Great Pyramid.
