= Regional Museum of Cholula =

Regional Museum of Cholula, Puebla, Mexico

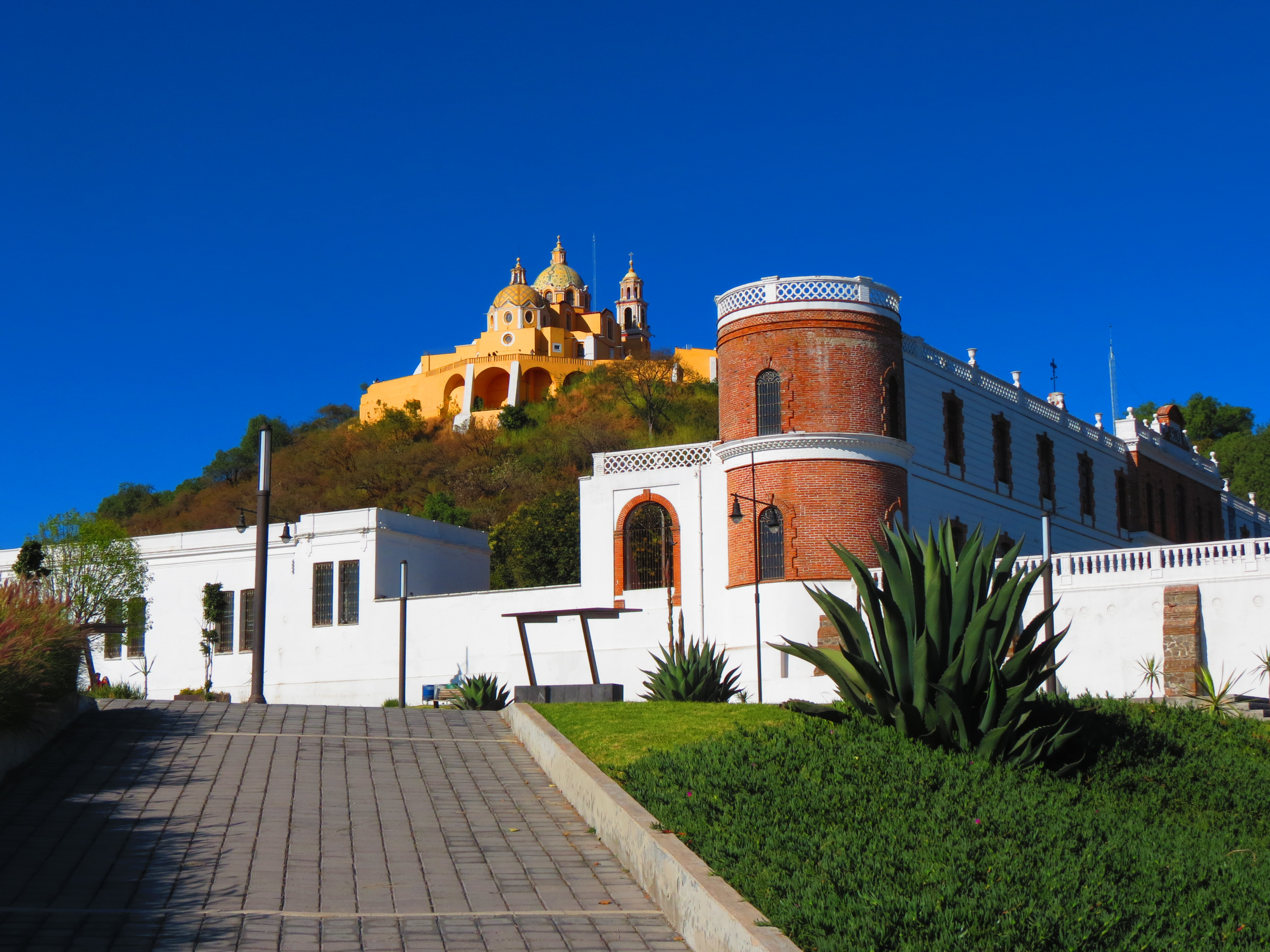
- Established: 2017
- Location: C. 14 Pte. 307, San Juan Aquiahuac, 72810 San Andrés Cholula, Pue., Mexico
- Coordinates: 19.057758°N 98.300676°W
- Type: Regional history
- Website: website

The Cholula Regional Museum is a public cultural institution in Mexico situated adjacent to the Great Pyramid of Cholula within the archaeological zone of Cholula, in the municipality of San Andrés Cholula. The museum houses a diverse collection spanning pre-Hispanic, viceregal, and contemporary art, as well as a showcase of popular art. It is important to distinguish this museum from the Cholula Site Museum, located nearby.

== History of the property ==
Opened to the public on January 23, 2017, the Cholula Regional Museum was a key component of a tourism development initiative aimed at securing the designation of Magic Town for San Andrés and San Pedro Cholula. The name "Cholula" is derived from the Nahuatl word "cholollan," signifying "place of refuge."

The Sanatorio de Nuestra Señora de Guadalupe building was repurposed as the Cholula Regional Museum, a cultural institution dedicated to preserving the history of the region. Today, the museum is part of the Decentralized Public Organization "Museos Puebla," under the Secretariat of Culture of the State of Puebla.

== Permanent exhibition halls ==
The site features eight exhibition rooms connected by corridors to the tunnels of the Great Pyramid and the public park. The exhibitions include pieces related to Poblano ceramics, a collection of alebrijes, and video projections showcasing Mexico as a World Heritage site.

=== Valley of the volcanoes ===
This gallery explores the diverse topography of the Puebla-Tlaxcala region, focusing on the prominence of the Popocatépetl and Iztaccíhuatl volcanoes. It delves into the geological history of the Sierra Nevada and its iconic peaks, emphasizing their significance in shaping regional culture and science, particularly in the realm of archaeoastronomy.

=== Cholula crossroads ===
This exhibition highlights the pivotal role of pre-Hispanic Cholula as a regional center for trade and tribute among various Mesoamerican cultures. It showcases a wide range of archaeological artifacts from across the country and spanning different time periods, from the Preclassic to the Postclassic era. An interactive digital component dedicated to the Mexica pantheon is also featured.

=== Viceregal: 16th to 18th centuries ===
This gallery showcases Viceroyalty Art, featuring paintings, sculptures, and objects created in various monasteries and churches of New Spain from the 16th to the 18th centuries. This collection highlights the Ex-convent of San Martín in Huaquechula, San Miguel Arcángel in Huejotzingo, San Gabriel in San Pedro Cholula, Nuestra Señora de los Remedios in San Andrés Cholula, the Assumption in Tochimilco, and the Franciscan Santa María de Jesús in Atlixco.

=== The Tlachihualtépetl, the origins ===
The fourth exhibition, El Tlachihualtepetl, goes into the beginnings of the first human settlements near the Popocatépetl volcano. It also explores the historical journey of constructing what is recognized as the largest pyramid in the world. The exhibition features archaeological artifacts from the Cholula region, with a particular emphasis on ceramics. Through a combination of objects and audiovisual displays, it explores the early human settlements in the Puebla-Tlaxcala Valley and the construction phases of the world's largest pyramid, the Tlachihualtépetl.

=== Tollan Cholollan, the resurgence ===
The fifth room is referred to as Tollan-Chollolan, symbolizing a resurgence. This gallery recounts the migrations of Olmec Xicalanga and Toltec Chichimeca peoples to Cholula, which marked a period of significant growth and development for the city. It goes into how the residents of the Cholula Valley interacted with their two ancestral guardians: the Iztaccíhuatl and the Popocatépetl. The eruptions of the latter led to a significant decline in the population during pre-Hispanic times, nearly resulting in the abandonment of the city. It explores Cholula 's transformation into a ceremonial, pilgrimage, and commercial center, emphasizing the enduring influence of pre-Columbian traditions on contemporary culture. A life-size replica of the Quauhquechollan Cloth is a focal point of the exhibition.

=== Alebrijes room ===
This room showcases temporary exhibitions which currently feature 35 alebrijes, tonas, and nahuales crafted from cardboard and copal wood. It features a collection of cardboard alebrijes by Pedro Linares, the art form 's creator, as well as wooden alebrijes with traditional Oaxacan roots. The exhibition highlights the imaginative nature of these creatures and their connection to Mexican artistic and manufacturing traditions.

=== Popular art of the State of Puebla ===
This gallery presents a comprehensive overview of the diverse artistic traditions of Puebla State. It showcases a vast array of handcrafted objects created by local artisans, reflecting the region's rich cultural heritage. From utilitarian kitchenware to exquisite religious art, the exhibition offers a captivating glimpse into the daily lives and spiritual beliefs of Puebla's people. Visitors can also explore the realm of decorative arts, the vibrant energy of festive traditions, and the intricate beauty of textiles. A dedicated section highlights the renowned Talavera pottery, showcasing both classic and contemporary styles.

Completing the exhibition is a focus on the symbolic importance of textiles and the enduring customs associated with the Day of the Dead. Through these diverse displays, the gallery provides a comprehensive understanding of Puebla's artistic legacy and its enduring cultural significance.

=== Gallery (Juaninos room) ===
This space is dedicated to the Hospitaller Order of San Juan de Dios (Juaninos), the founders of the building and the "Sanatorium of Our Lady of Guadalupe," a psychiatric hospital. The gallery explores the history of the institution and its role in the development of psychiatric care in Mexico. is also presented.

== Controversies ==
Following a review of the state's art collections, it was discovered that a significant number of pieces, totaling 5,981, were missing from nine museums in Puebla. These missing items ranged from books, paintings, documents, photographs to banknotes, with 881 pieces unaccounted for at the Regional Museum of Cholula.

== Gallery ==
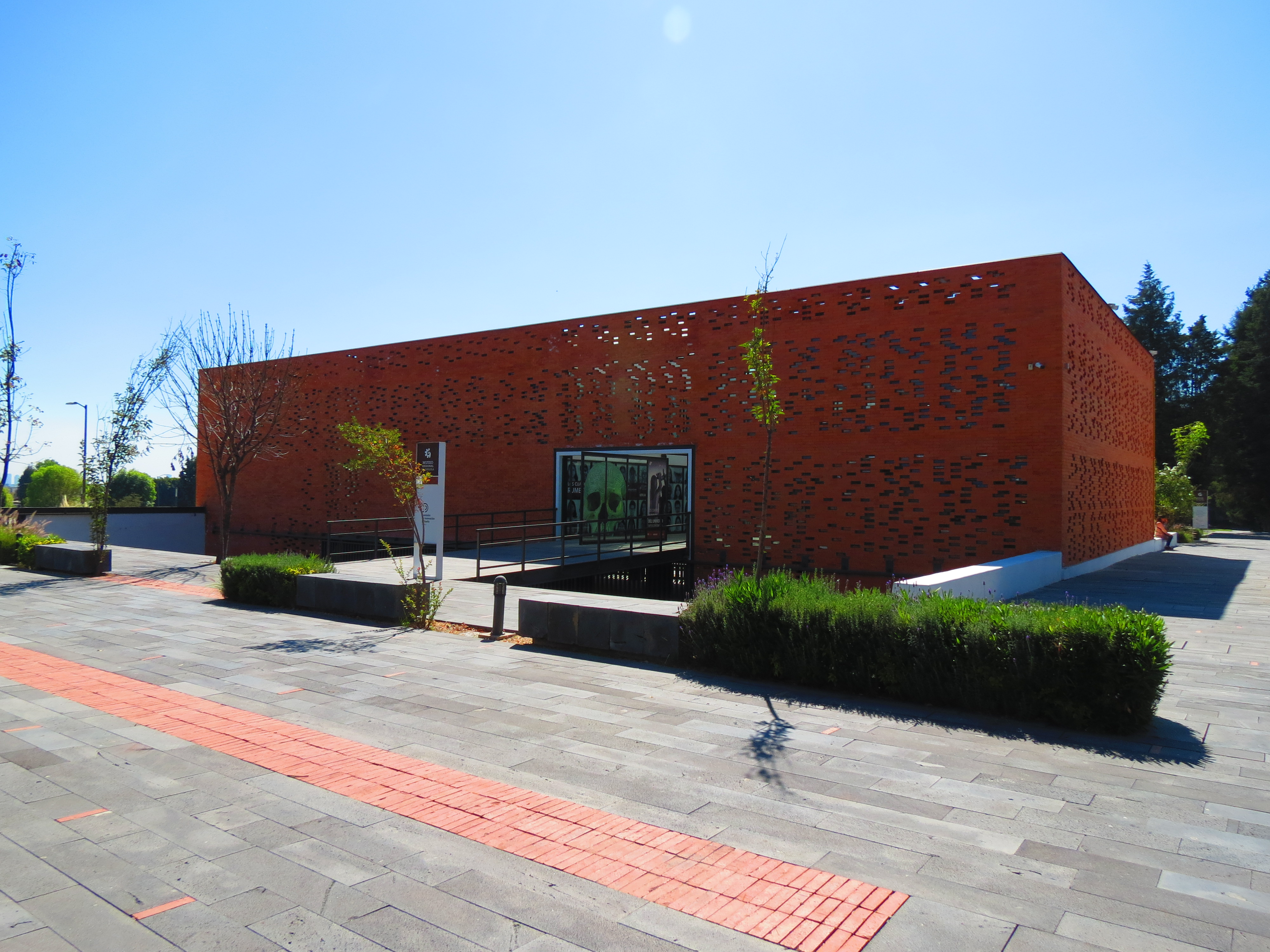
Patio area

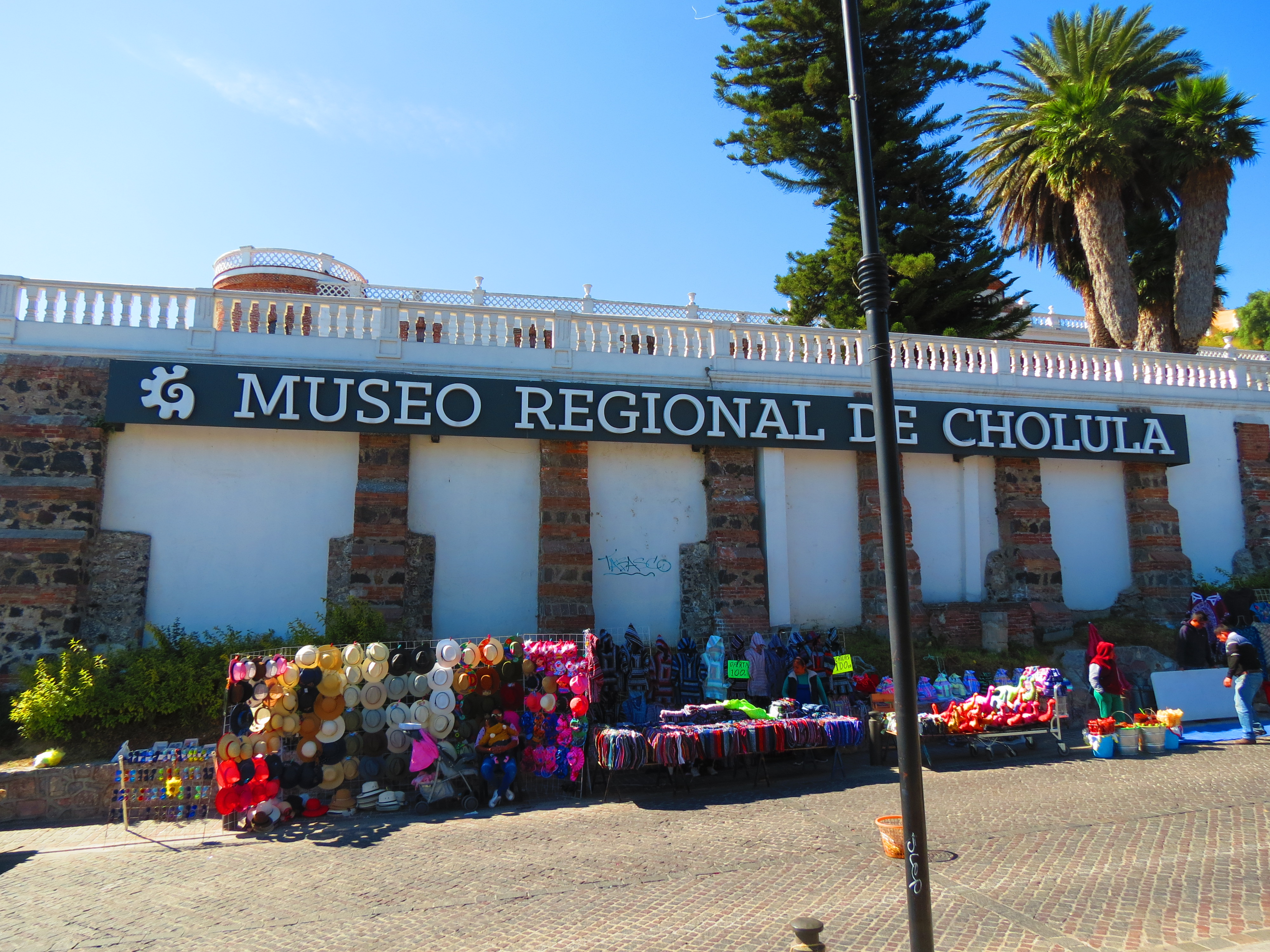
Exterior

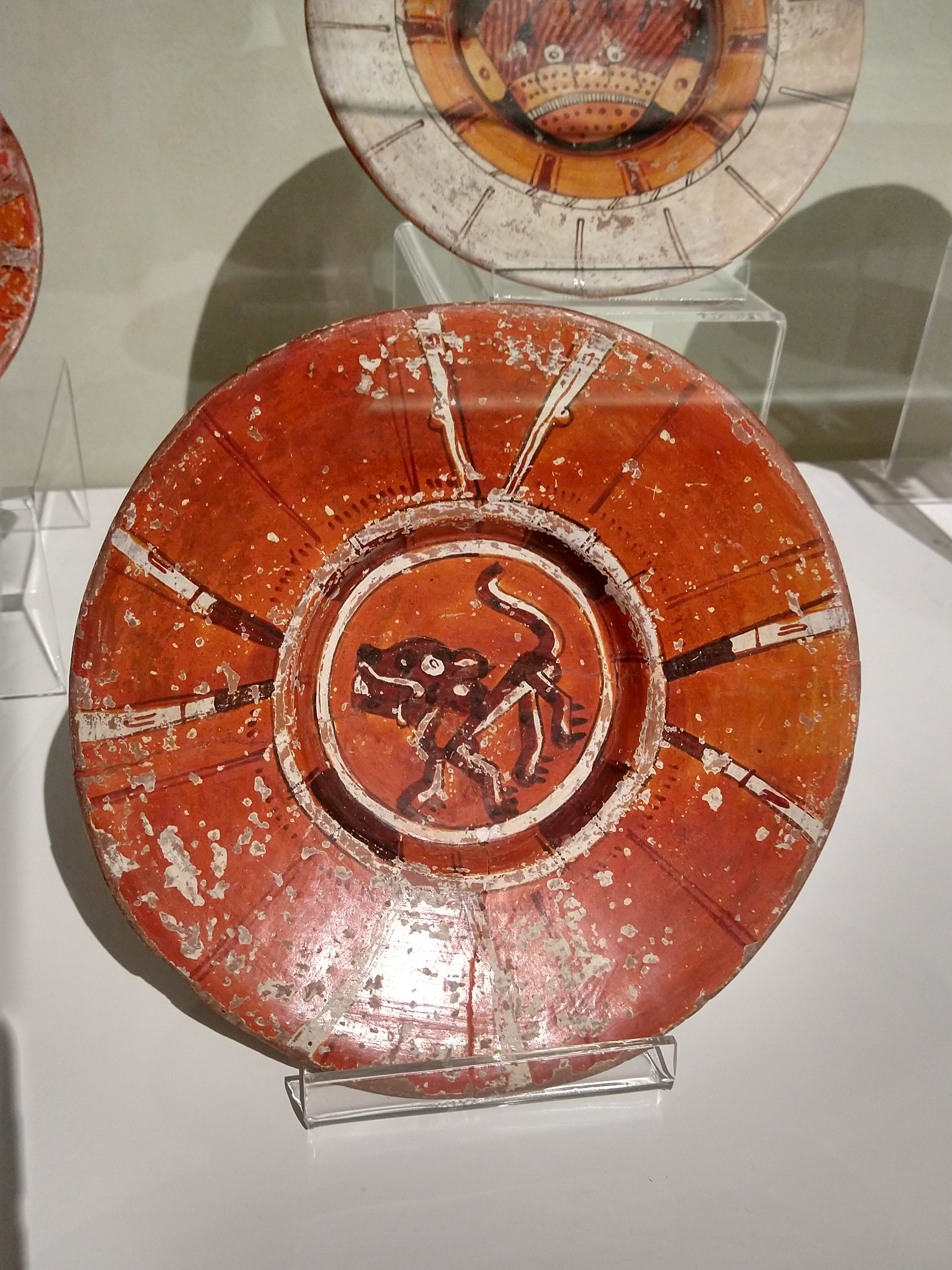
Cholultec pottery

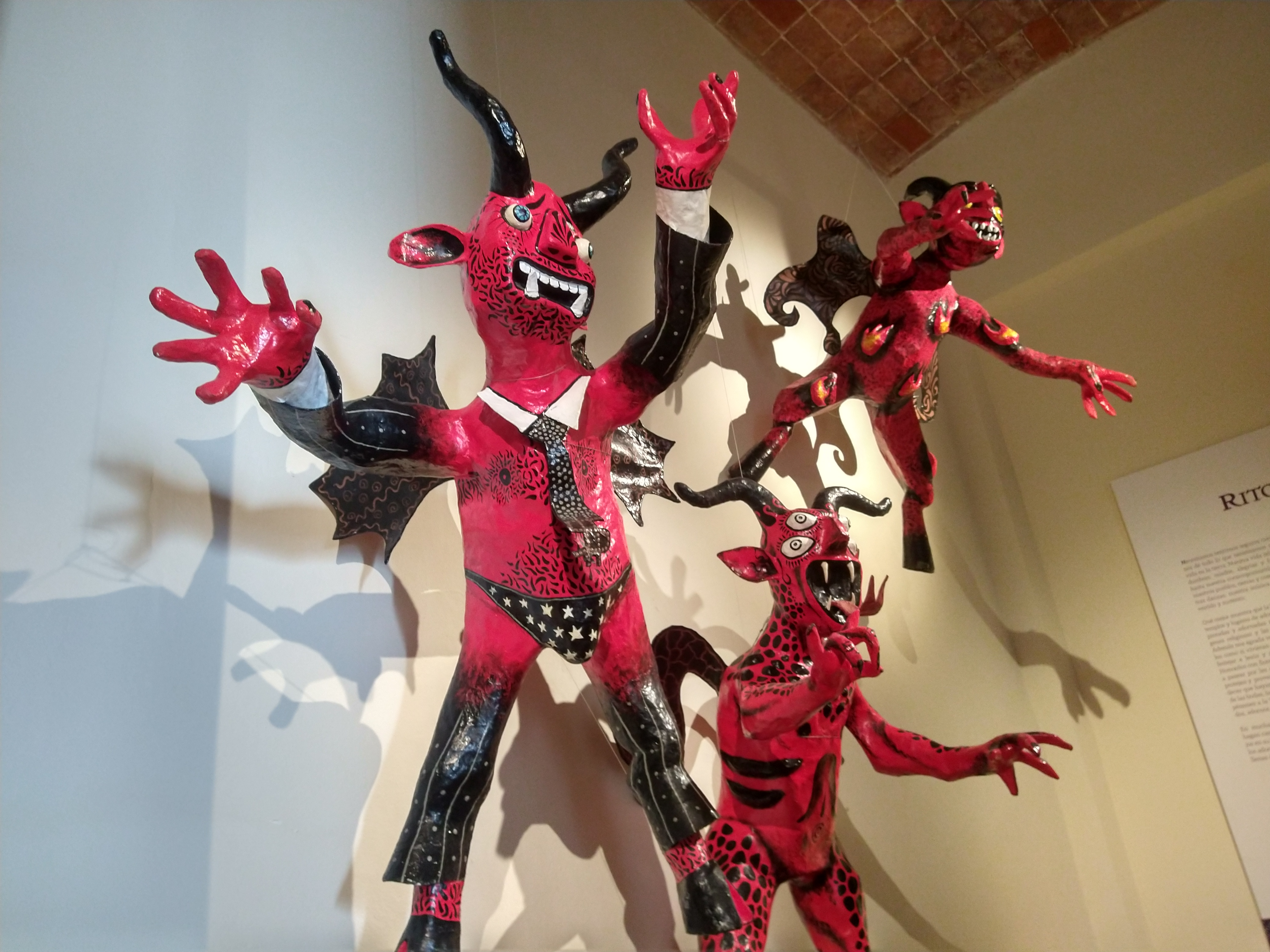
Cardboard devil

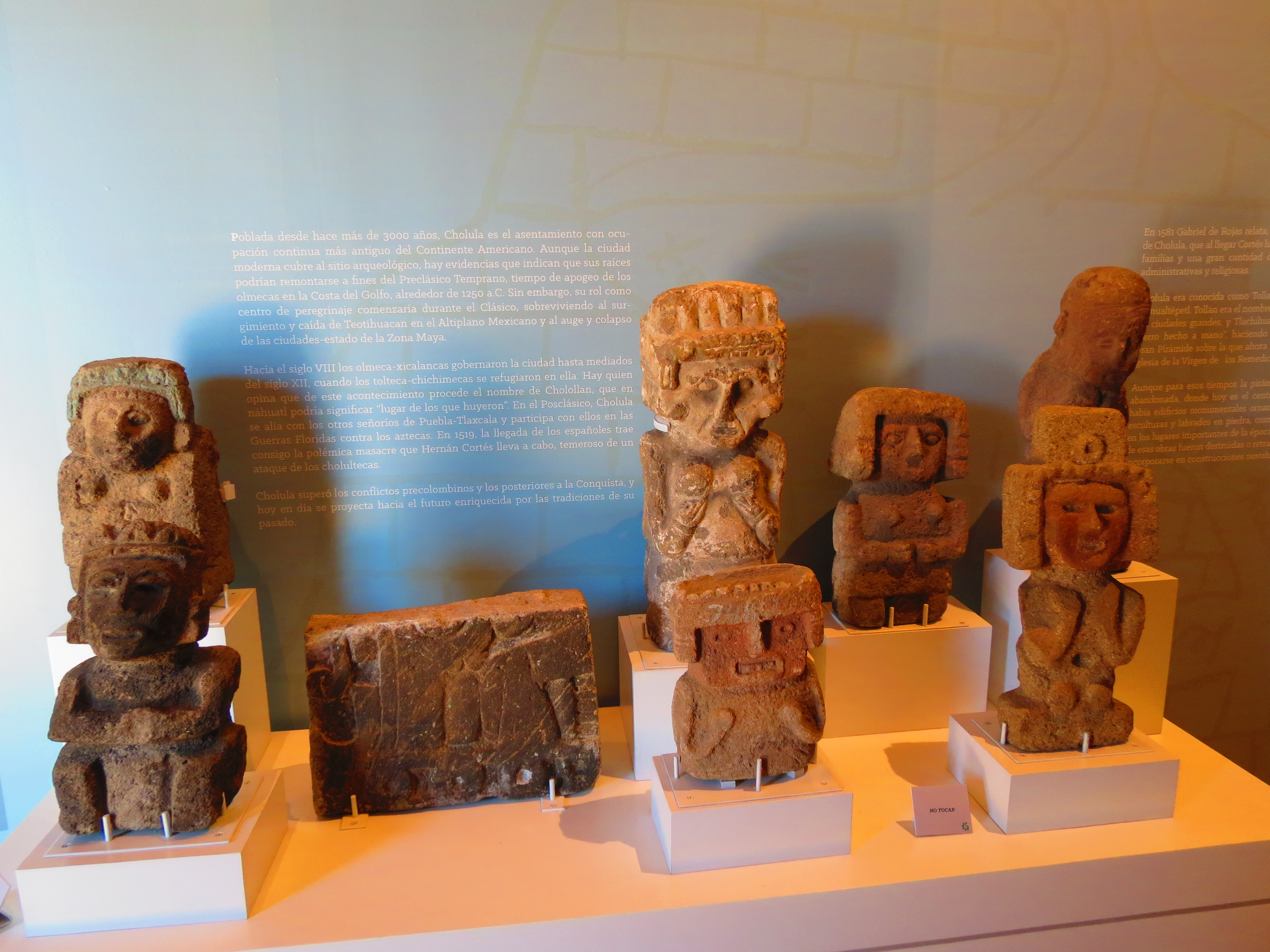
Olmec Figures

== See also ==
- Cholula, Puebla
