= José Julián Sidaoui =

José Julián Sidaoui Dib
- Born: 1953 (age 72–73); Puebla, Mexico
- Education: Universidad de las Américas Puebla (B.A.); University of Pennsylvania (M.A.)
- Alma mater: George Washington University (Ph.D.)

José Julián Sidaoui Dib, born in Puebla in 1953, is a Mexican financier and banker.

He earned a B.A. in economics from the Universidad de las Américas Puebla in 1973, a M.A. in Economics from the department of economics of the University of Pennsylvania in 1974, and a Ph.D. in economics from the George Washington University in 1978.

From 1976 to 1978, he worked at the World Bank as economic researcher in the Latin America and Caribbean area. He joined the Bank of Mexico in 1979, where he has worked as an analyst, treasurer, director of operations and key foreign exchange policymaker. On December 5, 1994, to December 1996, he was appointed Deputy Minister of Finance, where he developed and implemented programs to revive the Mexican economy, as well as promoting reform of the pension system. From January 1, 1997, until 2012, he was Deputy Governor of Bank of Mexico and a member of the board of directors.

Sidaoui Dib has authored several publications on topics such as Structural Change in the Mexican Economy, Manufactured Exports and Macroeconomic Policy. He has taught different subjects in Economics at Universidad Anahuac and at Instituto Politécnico Nacional.
