= San Andrés Cholula (municipality) =

- Municipality
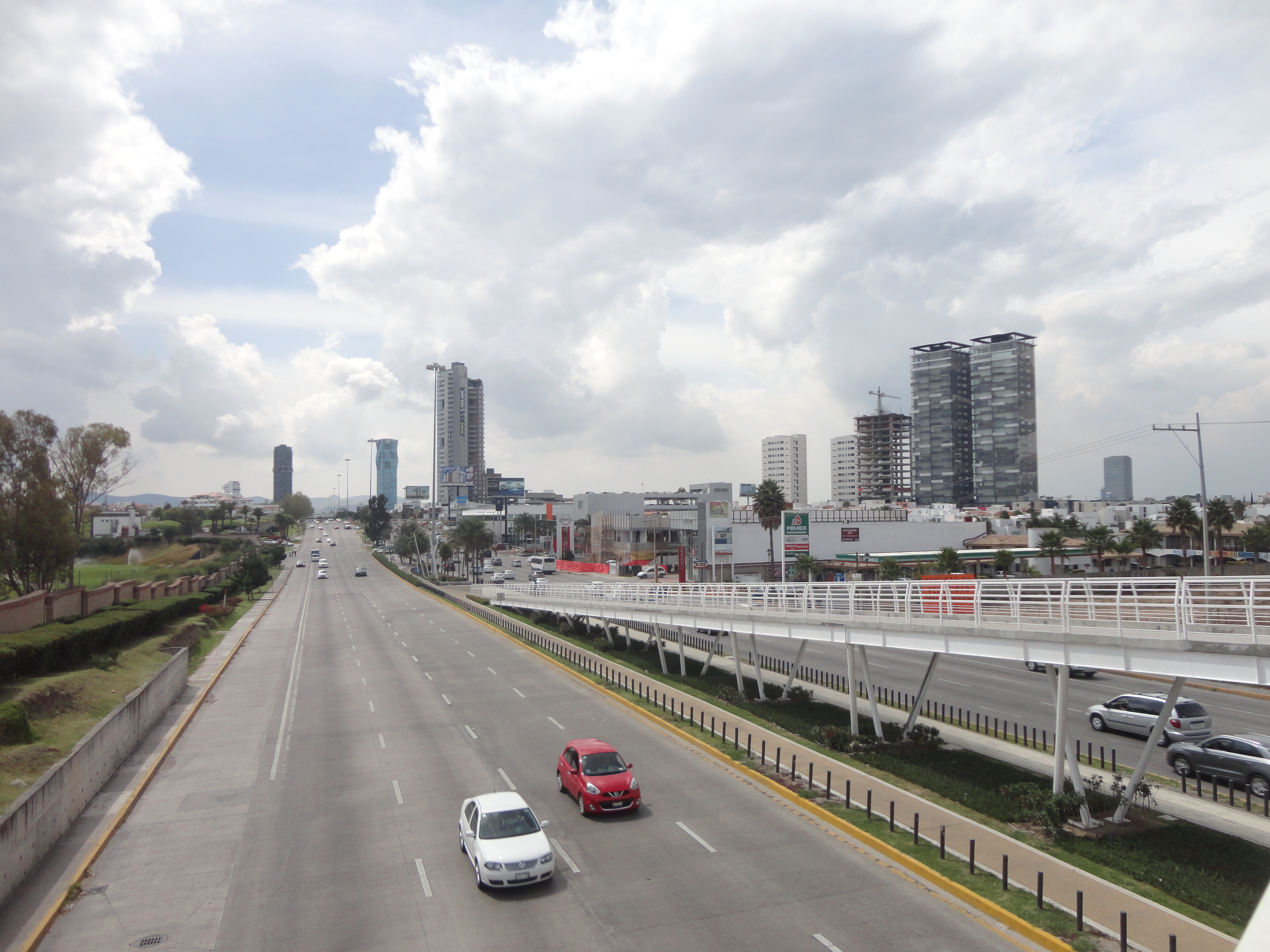

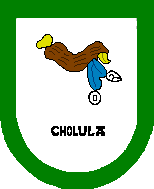
- Coat of arms

- Location within Puebla (state) Location within Mexico
- Coordinates: 19°03′N 98°18′W
- Country: Mexico
- State: Puebla
- Founded: 500-200 BCE
- Municipal Status: 1861

Government
  - Municipal President: Karina Pérez Popoca

Area
  - Municipality: 61 km^{2} (24 sq mi)
- Elevation (of seat): 2,150 m (7,050 ft)

Population (2005) Municipality
  - Municipality: 80,118
  - Urban area: 35,206
- Time zone: UTC-6 (Zona Centro)

San Andrés Cholula is a municipality in the Mexican state of Puebla. It forms part of the metropolitan area of Puebla, and as of 2011, it is the fastest-growing municipality that in the metropolitan area, partly because the presence of universities and the wealthiest neighborhoods ("Angelópolis" Zone) are located in San Andrés Cholula. Along with San Pedro Cholula and Santa Isabel Cholula, it is part of the most ancient still inhabited city in the Americas, Cholula de Rivadabia. Its seat is at San Andrés Cholula.

== The municipality as part of Cholula de Rivadavia ==
=== As part of the district ===
San Andrés Cholula is one of two municipalities which made up the city of Cholula, Puebla, officially called the Distrito Cholula de Rivadavia. Culturally and socially, the two halves are one city, but the city's political division into two municipalities: San Andrés Cholula and San Pedro Cholula, has its roots in the pre-Hispanic period. San Andrés encompasses the city and some more rural areas outside of it from the Great Pyramid of Cholula on east. The center for the entire city of Cholula is considered to be in the municipality of San Pedro Cholula, where the large Plaza de la Concordancia and the monastery of San Gabriel are. As part of the same city, the two municipalities share a number of common features. Both are located on the flat plains of the Valley of Puebla, with Popocatépetl and Iztaccíhuatl visible to the west. Like the city of Puebla, both sides have a straight street grid oriented to the cardinal directions. Most streets in the center are numbered with indications as to their location vis-à-vis the center, north, east, south or west. On the city periphery, street names lose this system. Both contain traditional Mexican markets and tianguis in which women can be found seated on the floor selling seeds, flowers, herbs and more. One food specialty is a cold drink made with chocolate and water, whipped until foamy served in wooden bowls with flowers painted on them. Other traditional foods here include Cholulteca soup, cecina with chili pepper strips and queso de canasta cheese, a type of edible larvae called cueclas, and "orejas de elefante" (elephant ears) which is an enormous tortilla with beans inside and salsa, cheese and cheese outside. Many Cholutecans still use their pre-Hispanic surnames, such as former town stewards Raymundo Tecanhuehue and Humberto Tolama Totozintle. This is because a number of the indigenous nobility was allowed certain privileges after the Conquest.

=== Urban area ===
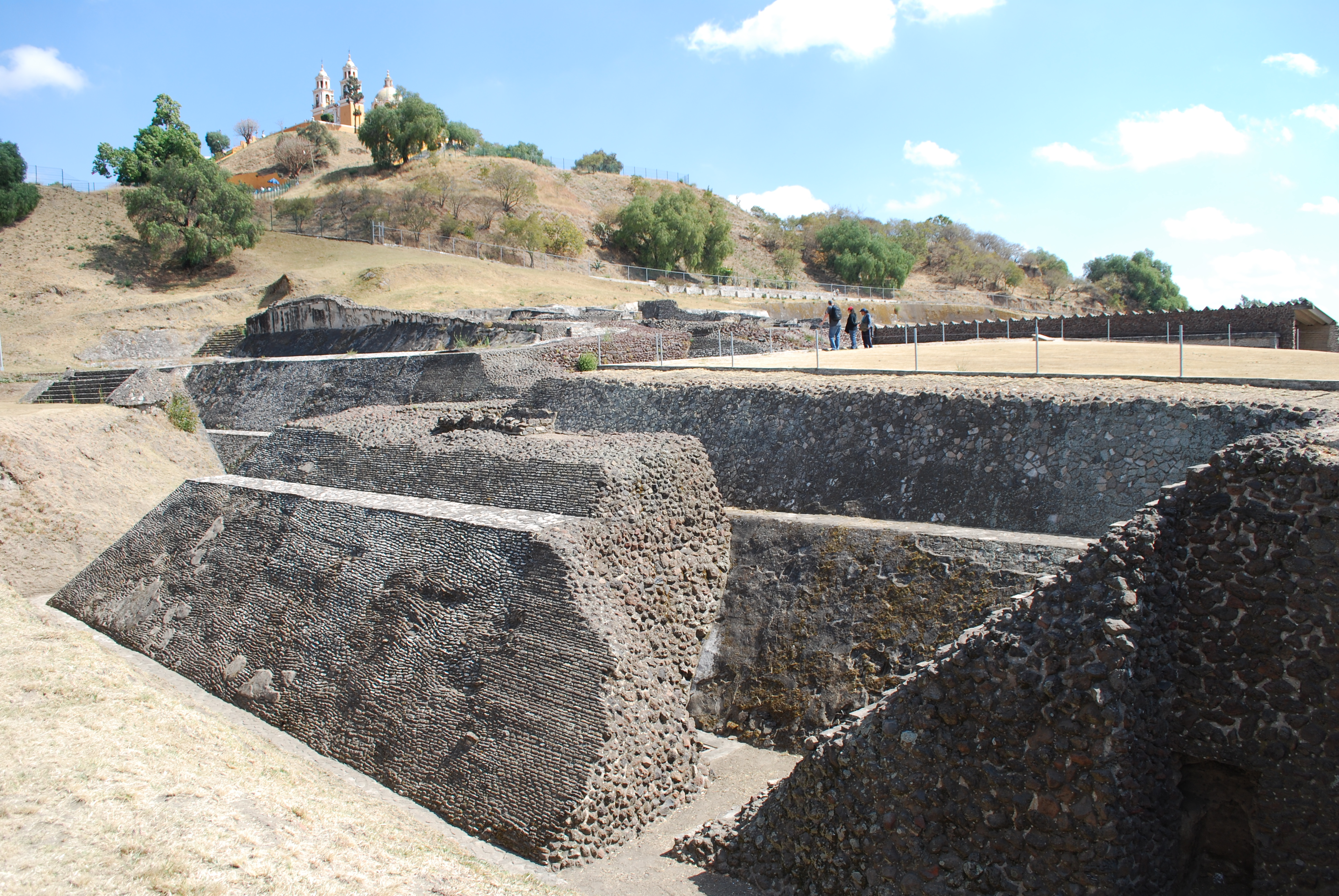
Looking over Building 3 towards the Nuestra Señora de los Remedios church on the pyramid.

Eight of the city's eighteen traditional barrios or neighborhoods are located in San Andrés. The division of the city into barrios, and into two halves, began in the pre Hispanic period. However, after the Spanish conquest of the Aztec Empire, the barrios were reorganized around parish churches, each given a patron saint. The San Andrés barrios are San Miguel Xochimehuacan, Santiago Xicotenco, San Pedro Colomoxco, Santa María Coaco, La Santísima, San Juan Aquiahuac, San Andresito and Santo Niño. Most of these barrios have a patron saint's name prefix before an indigenous name, which remains from the pre-Hispanic period. The neighborhoods closest to the center are urbanized, with those on the edges of the city maintaining more of their rural character, with economies based on agriculture and brick making. The unity of the city is maintained via a complicated system of social events and sponsorship to pay for them, which is rotated around the various barrios.

Most of what distinguishes San Andrés from San Pedro is its historically indigenous character. The division began in the latter pre Hispanic period after the Toltecs and Chichimecas conquered the city in the 13th century. They pushed the subdued Olmec-Xicallans to the east of the city. They also built a new temple to Quetzacoatl, where the San Gabriel monastery is now, leaving the Great Pyramid of Cholula as the religious focus of the southern part of the city. During the colonial period, San Andrés would remain mostly indigenous and relatively isolated economically while San Pedro's population became mestizo quickly. Today, San Andrés is still more residential and has a higher percentage of indigenous than San Pedro. As of 2005, there were 1,845 people who spoke an indigenous language in San Andrés, with the population growing from 45, 872 to 80,118 people from 1990 to 2005. Over ninety percent of the population identifies as Catholic with less than four percent identifying as Evangelical or Protestant.

Although the Cholula Pyramid and the San Gabriel monastery are only blocks from each other, the Pyramid is part of San Andrés, marking the beginning of this municipality. Because of the Cholula pyramid archeological site and because a number of streets on the San Andrés side are too narrow to permit vehicular traffic, the municipality has a mounted police force, with red jackets and hats similar to those of the Royal Canadian Mounted Police. It was created in 1996 and it is the only squad of its type in Mexico. The force has a number of advantages. The horses are permitted to climb the pyramid structure as they cannot damage the ruins underneath. They can access areas of the city cars cannot and they can be used to patrol in small rural areas such as San Rafael, Santa María Tonantzintla and Tehuiloyocan. The municipality states that in addition to security, the squad promotes interaction between the public and the police, and it has been popular with tourists as well.

=== Landmarks of the urban area ===
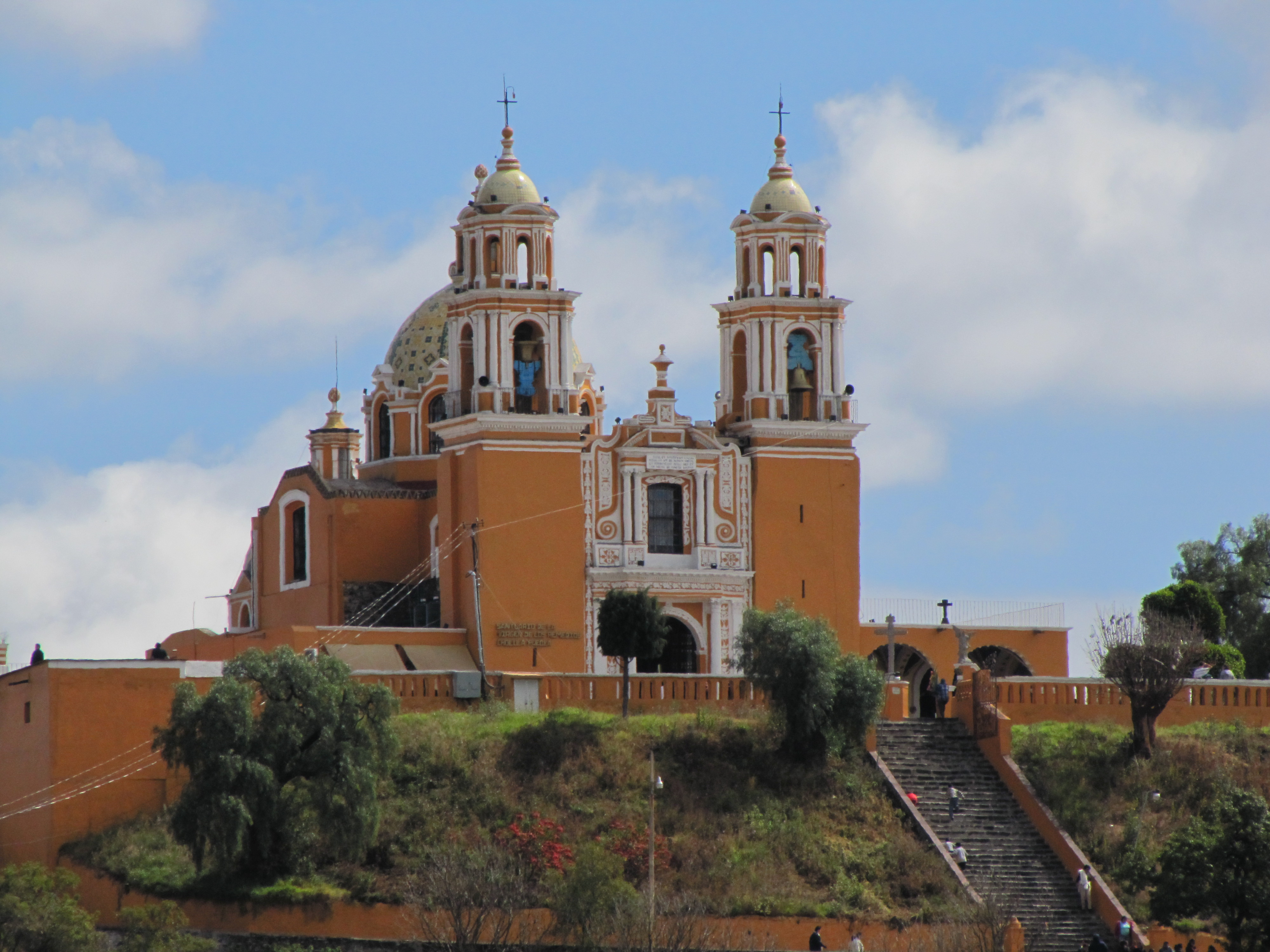
Nuestra Señora de los Remedios

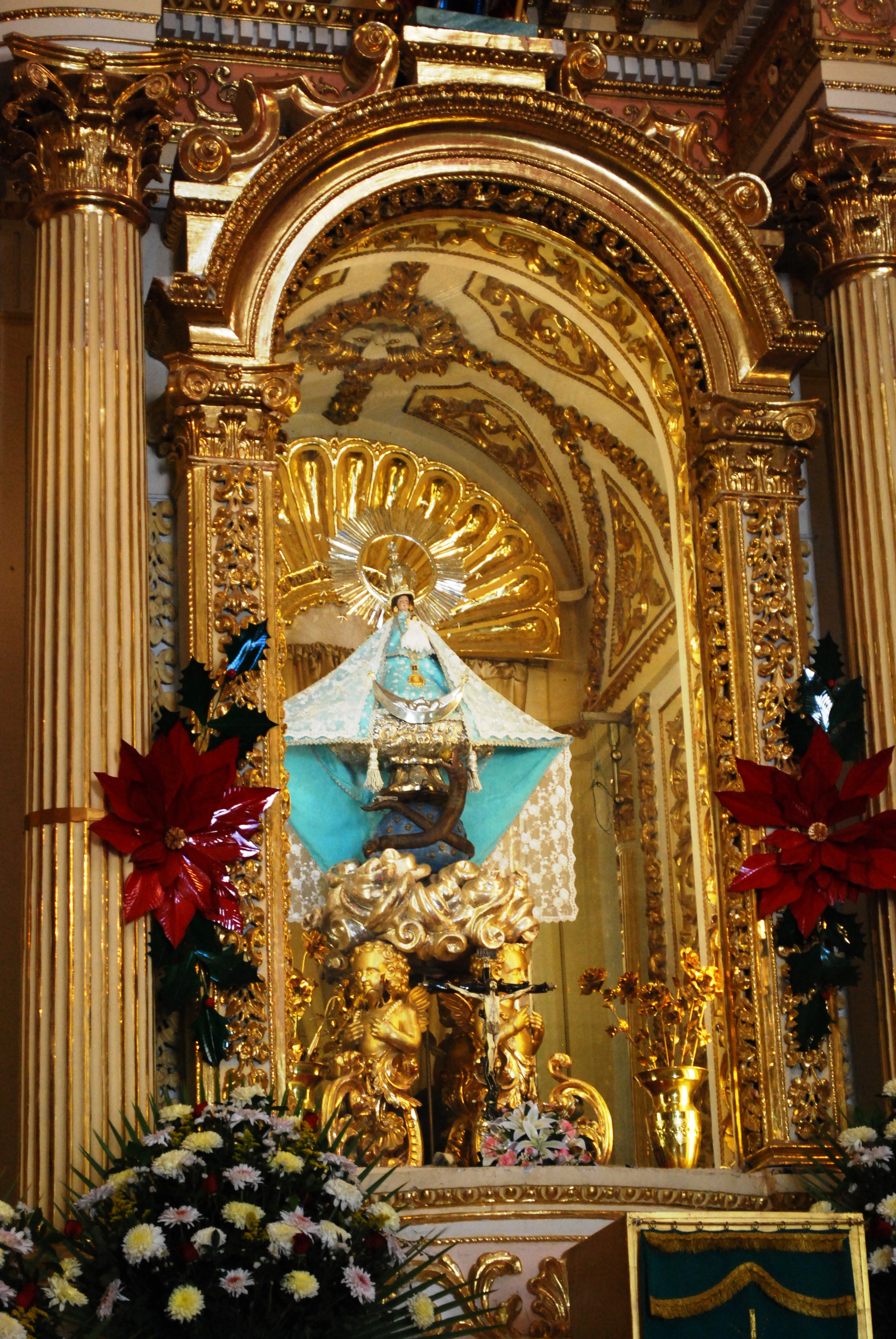
Image of the Virgin of the Remedies in the church

According to legend, the city of Cholula has 365 churches, one for each day of the year or one for each pre Hispanic temple destroyed by the Spanish, depending on the version. In reality there are only 37, 159 if all the small chapels in the local haciendas and ranches are counted. The architectural styles of the churches vary from Gothic to Renaissance to Churrigueresque and Neoclassical, with many mixing elements of two or more of the above. A number also have talavera tile as a decorative feature, which is common in Puebla. A few have intricate stucco work done by indigenous hands. Many of these churches contain artwork from the 16th to 19th centuries valued at millions of dollars. Due to the increase in theft of religious art, many of these churches have extra security and some close during the week.

The best-known church of San Pedro and the entire city of Cholula is the Nuestra Señora de los Remedios Sanctuary, whose bells ring each day at midday from atop the Cholula Pyramid. Just before the Spanish arrived, the pyramid was considered to be sacred to a female rain deity called Chiconahuiquiahuita (Nine Rains). After finding pre Hispanic idols and other pieces on what seemed to be a hill, monks decided to rededicate it to the Virgin of the Remedies and built this church, beginning in 1594. The Virgin of the Remedies was one of four Virgin Mary images which were used to substitute for pre Hispanic female deities in the cardinal directions from Mexico City. This one was placed in the east, with the Virgin of Guadalupe to the north, the Virgin of Mercy to the south and the "Virgen de la Bala" to the south. The image itself measures 27 centimeters tall, similar to those brought by Hernán Cortés and leading to speculation what it was brought by him, but it was brought by the Franciscans. Originally, the Virgin of the Remedies was associated with the needs of the poor, but the history of the Conquest linked this Virgin Mary image to the conquistadors and would remain so up through the Mexican War of Independence. Because of the veneration of the image, as the patroness of Cholula, the pyramid remains a place of pilgrimage for the area. The church has suffered damage on various occasions from lightning strikes and from earthquakes. These lightning strikes in the past were accredited to the old rain goddess. The lightning strikes have caused minor damage, but the earthquakes have been more serious. In 1864, the church was almost completely destroyed by an earthquake. It took ten years to rebuild and was re inaugurated in 1873. The next major quake to damage the building came in 1999, which damaged the towers and caused the pilgrims' portal to collapse, with damage to eighty percent of the building.

The atrium cross dates to 1666 and it is the same as found in the Capilla Real and the church at San Miguel Tianguisnahutl. The dome is covered in multicolored tiles. The overall style of the church is Baroque with Neoclassical elements, which is sometimes called "Republican Baroque." The altars are made of wood and plaster painted white and decorated in gold leaf. There is also gold leaf on the vaults and walls. It contains oil paintings such as those depicting the birth of the Virgin Mary, the Announcement to the Virgin Mary, Mary and Joseph, and the Sacred Heart of Jesus. Sculptures include those of the Archangel Michael on the main altar, Diego de Alcalá, and Salvador of Horta. The cupola contains images of the four doctors of the Church: Jeronimo, Gregory, Ambrose and Augustine, as well as images of John Duns Scot, Bonaventure, Bernard of Siena, and Anthony of Padua. There are also allegories representing Justice, Faith and Virtue. The vaults contains images related to the saying of the Rosary.

The parish of San Andrés is what remains of a Franciscan church and monastery which was founded shortly after the founding of the much larger Franciscan monastery of San Gabriel. By the second half of the 16the century, the need for a second Franciscan monastery in the city was discussed because even though the San Gabriel monastery was large, it was insufficient to reach the mostly indigenous population of the San Andrés side, only a league away. According to records from a monk named Agustin de Vetancurt, the monastery was authorized in 1557 by of Joanna of Castile, sister of Felipe II. Cholula is the only city other than Mexico City to contain two Franciscan monasteries and probably indicates that the two halves of the city maintained a social and political distinction after the Conquest.

However, the authorization of the second monastery was soon disputed, as it changed created a second pole of power away from the Spanish dominated San Pedro side. Even so, by 1585, the monastery was a very small institution with only two monks. The construction of the complex took decades. Its cost forced the monks to sell some of its land, and the project was viable only because the indigenous of the area provided their labor. The complex was not finished until 1670. Before then, however, the church was given over to regular clergy in 1640. In 1673, the repeated complaints about the monastery's authorization resulted in an order to the Marquis de Mancera to demolish the complex, even though some records indicate there were still Franciscans inhabiting it. Mancera was aware of the royal records related to the institution, so he decided to demolish most of the monastery area and only close down the church, after removing all of the altars and decorative elements. Some years later, the Count of Monclova allowed the church to reopen as the parish of San Andrés in 1686.

During the rest of the colonial period and through the 19th century, the church remained functioning, according to parish records, and still in possession of remaining monastery lands. In the early 20th century, it was decided to renovate the church and lands were sold to raise money. The entrance of the church bears the date of 1930, which the work was concluded. One of the changes was the replacement of the wood flooring to tile. The wood was reused to make benches. In the 1950s, a church school was built and named Miguel Hidalgo, but today the building is used as parish offices. This school was replaced by another built in the 1980s in a different location.

The earthquake of 1999, forced many San Andrés churches to close for repairs including Santiago Xicotenco, Santo Niño, San Pedro Colomoxco, Santa María Cusco, San Andresito, San Miguel, San Juan Aquiahuac, Tonantzintla and Tlaxcalancingo. The parish of San Andres was one of the most damaged as the cupola came down, along with much of the towers and outer walls. The parish church would remain closed until 2001, with services held in the atrium or auditorium. Rebuilding efforts were largely financed by INAH. The church reopening in 2001, but repair and redecoration work lasted until 2003.

The parish of San Andrés Cholula occupies an area of 17,187 m^{2}, with includes the church, the remains of the monastery, the atrium, the priest's residence, parish offices, basketball courts and auditorium in what used to be the cemetery. The church has an east–west orientation and is classified as a single name with a polygon apse. The nave has three sections with the area over the presbytery the highest. It also has a sacristy. The main portal is one of the highest in Mexico, made of grey sandstone with a relatively simple design. Figures sculpted are delineated clearly, and represent Franciscan saints including Saint Andrew along with other decorative elements. It also contains the date of 1630, a reference to the building of an ante-sacristy at that time. The layout of the monastery area predates the church to the 16th century, although it was modified over the centuries it was in existence. It follows the design of many other monasteries from that time in Puebla with a square cloister, refectory, pilgrim portal, meditation room (sala de profundis) and sacristy.

Other significant churches in the urban area include San Gabriel and Santisima Trinidad. The San Gabriel church was constructed during the first third of the 17th century, with the main portal bearing the date of 1630. The interior has one nave, which contains altars in a style called Baroque Republicano (Baroque with Neoclassical elements). The Santisima Trinidad church has an atrium with a double arched entrance with merlons on top. The facade of the church is simple with an arched main entrance. This facade also has merlons. The interior has two Churrigueresque altars.

The Antigua Casa del Gobernador (Old Governor's House) was probably built after San Andres received its status as an Indian Republic, which was in 1714. This building held sessions of the council, elections for governor, mayors and other officials of the Republic. During the 19th century, it remained as the city council hall, but today is a multipurpose facility.

The campus of the Universidad de las Americas is located on the San Andrés side of the city. This has spurred a lively nightclub scene mostly catering to students, including some who travel from Puebla. This also includes a line of strip clubs along Avenida 14 Oeste between 5 de Mayo and Calle 2 Norte. Some of these establishments include Unit, Bar-Restaurant Enamorada, La Casa del Mojito and Jazzatlán Café. However, the municipality is quiet during the week when these establishments are closed.

Container City is a complex constructed from large shipping containers. The idea is from England, but this version was built by a Mexican organization. Fifty of these containers have been joined to create 4,500 meters of spaces used to house workshops, restaurants, galleries and other businesses. There are even a few homes made of the containers in the area. The complex is painted in bright colors. The hallways have wireless Internet service, a music lounge for visitors, an entertainment area, ping pong tables and more. Some of the businesses inside include Beat Box, Hackl breads, Smart Mac, and Vibra (a meditation center).

=== Outside the urban area ===
Outside of the urban area, San Andrés has a number of important communities including San Francisco Acatepec, San Antonio Cacalotepec, San Rafael Comac, San Luis Tehuiloyocan, San Bernardino Tlaxcalancingo and Santa Maria Tonanzintla.

San Francisco Acatepec's economy is mostly based on livestock production along with the growing of corn, beans and animal feed. It is 6 km from the urban center and has a population of less than 100 people. It is best known for its parish church, which was constructed in the 17th century in Mexican Baroque style. The facade is covered in handmade red Talavara ceramic tile, made by local craftsmen between 1650 and 1750. These tiles completely cover the niches, columns, capitols and towers. Like others in the area, there is a syncretism of Catholic and indigenous imagery and while it has had some modifications over the years, it still retains most of its original character. In 1940, the church was mostly destroyed by fire, with only its facade salvaged. Everything in the interior, including its wooden altars and stucco work was lost. The altars were replaced by stucco ones covered in gold, maintaining the Churrigueresque style of the originals. This and other elements, such as paintings called El Lavatorio and La Ultima Cena by José Rubi Marimon, have allowed to the church to maintain its traditional look. The main celebration is the feast of its patron, Francis of Assisi, on 4 October.

Santa María Tonanzintla is primarily dedicated to the raising of livestock with some cultivation of corn, beans and flowers. It is 3.5 km from the city center and has a population of less than 100 people. Santa Maria contains seven images of Christ, which are believed to safeguard the town. Its main celebration is 8 December, the day of the Immaculate Conception.

The church here is the best known example of Indigenous or Folk Baroque in Puebla<. Its interior has elaborate stuccowork with Catholic and indigenous imagery done in a variety of colors. Church construction spans the 16th to the 20th centuries but most of the stucco work began in the 17th century. The first phase of construction began in the 16th century, with a small sanctuary, whose vestiges are located just north of the current church. The first church on this spot was built in the middle of the 16th century with a simple nave and façade, now destroyed. The second phase began at the end of the 17th century and beginning of the 18th, when the bell tower, cupola, basic layout and a small sacristy were built. Decorative stucco work was also done on the apse. The third phase covers most of the 18th century when the structure was completed, expanding the nave, leaving the tower within it, and a new façade. The last phase covers the 19th and early 20th centuries, when the final details were finished.

The stucco work includes images of dark skinned angels, tropical fruits, ears of corn, eagle warriors, cherubs, serpents, dark skinned angels, children playing among flowers and fish along with the Four Evangelists, Francis of Assisi, Saint Anthony, Christ, Quetzalcoatl and especially the Virgin Mary. There is also a work called Nuestra Señora de Tzocuilac by Pascual Perez in 1752. In the pre Hispanic period, the area was sacred to Tonantzin, or the mother goddess, who was substituted by the Virgin Mary after the Conquest. The church was built over a shrine to this goddess. Conservation of the church is not supported by INAH or the state of Puebla as the residents will not permit either of these to have any authority over the building. They also do not allow the church to come under the jurisdiction of the Catholic Church. A priest is hired when they want Mass.

Near the church, there is an observatory named after astrophysicist Luis Enrique Erro, founded in 1942. Its formal name is the Instituto Nacional de Astrofísica, Optica y Electrónica Luis Enrique Erro. It has been the site a numerous studies, especially in supernovas, and it is considered to be one of the most productive academic institutions in the country.

San Bernardino Tlaxcalancingo is a community 4 km from the city center, with a population of about 16,000. It is dedicated to livestock along with the cultivation of corn, beans and nopal cactus. Its nopal production is significant and in 2005, it began exporting the crop to China. The community was founded by the Spanish as they divided lands among the conquistadores, dedicated to Bernard of Siena. Its church is from the 17th century, and its facade contains bricks and tiles of various colors. Its Salomonic columns are also covered in tiles, along with its bell tower. The side portal of the church and the priest's quarters are decorated with the faces of children and flowers.

The community is home to Parque Loro, which contains more than 400 animals in danger of extinction, with information about each for the visitor. Animals include monkeys, tigers, jaguars, pumas, reptiles, miniature horses and more. It has an auditorium with animal shows. It also has a playground, an area for pre Hispanic dance and an area in which visitors can have their picture taken with an endangered species.

San Luis Tehuiloyocan is a community of about 3,800 people, five km from the city center. It is decided mostly to livestock, especially domestic fowl and pigs. It also cultivates corn, beans and vegetables. This community is best known for a 17th-century house which is boarded up and the exterior is deteriorated. There is nothing unusual about the exterior except the fact that there are no windows. However, the walls of the large inner courtyard have mosaics of encrusted volcanic stone that depicts a goat, a rabbit, flames and elements of the Passion of Christ, such as the weeping face of Saint Veronica, her tear flowing red. The dominant images framing the main doorway are two monkeys with their tongues sticking out and dancing. On the ends of their legs are crow's feet and on their heads are bishops' hats. Both have erect penises and have bowls of steaming liquid in front of them. In a room in the back, there is a beam with the "Magnificat" a speech by the Virgin Mary, in Latin and in reverse. Christian iconography has used the monkey as a symbol of people in the control of the Devil and many suspect the house was used for Satanic rites, especially in the 18th century. It is the only example known of its kind in Mexico. Other communities include San Antonio Cacalotepec and San Rafael Comac. Both are mostly dedicated to livestock, especially domestic fowl, with the cultivation of corn and beans. Cacalotepec is about 5 km from the city center with a population of less than 100. Comac is only two km from the city center and has a population of about 2,300.

The La Virgen Bridge dates from the 16th century. According to legend, in 1590, a group of Franciscans were returning to Spain with the image of the Virgin of the Remedies without permission. When they reached this bridge, their horses threw them and fought with them, preventing their advance. When the news of the event spread, it was believed that the Virgin herself provoked this as a miracle. However, many who are familiar with the area, including local bus drivers are not aware of the community either.

== Education ==
The municipality contains eighteen preschools, twenty six primary schools, thirteen middle schools and three high schools. There is also one technical/professional school above the high school level. It is also the home of the main campus of the Universidad de las Américas-Puebla an exclusive, private university. This campus has large well-manicured grounds, athletic facilities including a gridiron for American football. It has a large library with auditorium which hosts the Cine Club Las Américas, where students present independent films. and it has two galleries, the Sala José Cuevas and the Sala Bertha Cuevas in the main administration building.

Also, it is home to other private and exclusive universities, Universidad Anahuac (Puebla Campus), Universidad del Valle de México (Puebla Campus), Instituto Tecnológico de Monterrey (Puebla Campus), Universidad Iberoamericana (Puebla Campus).

== Economy and tourism ==
The employment in the municipality is roughly evenly divided among agriculture, industry, construction and commerce and tourism. About thirty percent of the population is dedicated to agriculture and livestock. Principle crops include corn, beans and animal feed. Livestock includes dairy and meat cattle, pigs, and domestic fowl, mostly for auto consumption. Another thirty percent is dedicated to industry and construction. Most industry is related to the making of cheese and other dairy products, furniture making and rustic ironwork. Just under thirty five percent is dedicated to commerce and tourism. Most commerce is geared towards local needs with two important exceptions, the nightclub scene and tourism, which is focused on the Great Pyramid of Cholula. The pyramid, topped by the Nuestra Señora de los Remedios Church is one of the region's main tourist attractions, making Cholula one of the better known destinations in central Mexico for foreign travelers. Images of this church on top of the pyramid with Popocateptl in the background is frequently used in Mexico's promotion of tourism.

== Geography ==
The municipality of San Andrés Cholula forms one half of the city of Cholula de Rivadavia in the center west of the state of Puebla. San Andres borders the municipalities of San Pedro Cholula, Ocoyucan, Puebla and San Gregorio Atzompa.

It is located in the Valley of Puebla in the Central Highlands of Mexico with an average altitude of 2150 meters above sea level.

=== Hydrography ===
The valley floor is an expanse of plains crossed by a number of small rivers, streams and arroyos, with the most significant being the Atoyac River. The Atoyac River has its beginning in the runoff of both the Iztaccíhuatl and Popocatepetl volcanoes. The municipality is located in the Valley of Puebla on mostly flat land, with a decline towards the southeast towards the Atoyac River. There are only a few low hills that do not extend for more than sixty meters above the valley floor, which as those located in the communities of San Francisco Acatepec and San Bernabé Temoxtitla. The municipality is in the southern part of the high basin of the Atoyac River, forms the border between San Andres and the city of Puebla. The Zapatero River runs east through the municipality and empties into the Atoyac. There are also a number of seasonal arroyos such as the Alamo.

=== Climate ===
It has a temperate climate with an average temperature of between 18 and 20C, and typically no more than 20 to 40 days with frost per year. There is a rainy season that lasts from May to October which provides about 800 to 900 mm of rainfall per year. This climate made the area very important for agricultural production in the pre Hispanic and colonial eras. The climate is temperate and semi moist with rains in the summer. Average temperatures range between 18 and 20C. January is the coldest months with average temperatures of between 10 and 16C, and May is the warmest with averages between 20 and 22C. The only forested area is an area associated with the Sierra del Tentzo, which contains holm oak and scrub. The rest of the area is either farmland or covered by human settlements.

== History ==
The first human settlements of Cholula are within the confines of the San Andrés municipality and date somewhere between 500 and 200 BCE, during the middle Preclassic period. Through the Classic period, the village grew and social hierarchy developed, with the first pyramid to define this social and religious hierarchy begun at the end of the Preclassic.

At the end of this period, many settlements were abandoned, but Cholula grew, making it politically dominant in the region. It rapidly developed into an urban center in the Classic period (200–800 CE) dominating the Puebla-Tlaxcala region, growing to an area of about four km^{2} and a population of between 20,000 and 25,000. The Great Pyramid of Cholula was expanded twice during this time. The city had relations with the larger Teotihuacan, but the nature of this is not known. However, at the end of the Classic period, Teotihuacan fell. Cholula had a population decline but the city survived. However, there is evidence of a change of dominant ethnicity, with a people known as the Olmec-Xicallana coming to power and pottery and other artifacts showing Gulf Coast influence. The city continued to grow during the Post Classic period (900–1521) as well, although there was another regime change. Toltec-Chichimecas from the fall the Tula arrived in the 12th century as refugees. The ruling Olmeca-Xicallanca allowed their arrival but oppressed them, until the Toltec-Chichimecas revolted and took over in the 13th century. The new lords called themselves the Choloteca, but they did not eliminate the Olmeca-Xicallanca. The defeated group was pushed to the eastern half of the city and the surrounding areas, maintaining a certain amount of religious and political autonomy, centered on the pyramid. This is the origin of the San Andrés municipality. At around this same time, there was significant destruction on the Great Pyramid, especially the latest constructions. By the time the Spanish arrived, Cholula was actually divided into three sub entities, roughly corresponding to the municipalities of San Pedro Cholula, San Andrés Cholula and Santa Isabel Cholula. However, only the first two are considered to be part of the modern city of Cholula. San Andrés is defined by the area east of the Great Pyramid and includes it. The city was important as a mercantile crossroads and a religious center, although religious practice was centered on the Quetzalcoatl Temple in San Pedro rather than on the Pyramid, which was overgrown... Hernán Cortés noted he could see about 2,000 houses in the city with as many temples as days of the year. It had a population of about 100,000, however, the area was overpopulated leading to chronic hunger among the poor. During the Conquest, the Spanish would kill about 6,000 residents of the city in an event known as the Cholula Massacre. It is from this episode that the 365 churches legend evolves.

San Andres was the encomienda of Andrés de Tapia for a very short time, and then it was turned over to Rodrigo Rangel. In 1529, it was divided between Diego Fernandez de Proaño and Diego Pacheco. In 1531, the Cholula area was converted into a "corregimiento" or area under direct control of the Spanish Crown. In 1537, Cholula became an independent city. and granted its own coat of arms by Charlves V. in 1540. San Andrés as an entity was recognized as early as 1548, when records show eight communities governed by it. Organization of what is now the municipal territory changed over time, but San Andrés remained an independent political entity from the 18th century on. The Spanish built nearby Puebla to overshadow Cholula and the city never recovered its former status. An epidemic wiped out much of its indigenous population in the 1540s. Over the colonial period, forty-seven churches were constructed in the city, with San Andrés as an independent parish by 1640. In 1714, it was definitively separated from San Pedro as an "Indian Republic" along with San Bernardino Tlaxcalancingo, Santa Clara Ocoyucan and San Antonio Cacalotepec. This separation would cause political and economic problems between the two halves of the city, but still coexisting in matters of religion. The evangelization of San Andrés also differed from neighboring San Pedro. It remained indigenous while San Pedro quickly became mestizo. Also in the early colonial period, this part of the city has enough land to meet its own food needs and not be dependent on the outside economically. One reason the division remained was that during all of the colonial period and much into the 19th century, the Spanish and their descendants were mostly found on the San Pedro side, in what is still considered to be the center of the city of Cholula. Indigenous kept to their own neighborhoods in San Andrés and the outer communities of San Pedro. Despite the population eventually becoming almost all mestizo over the centuries, this division remains. Today, that division is recognized by the municipal status of San Andrés, which was established in 1861.

The city was named the Distrito Cholula de Rivadavia in 1895 by the state in honor of Bernardino de Rivadavia. Since the founding of the first two villages, Cholula has never been abandoned, making it the oldest continuously inhabited city in the Americas.
