= Santa Isabel Cholula =

- Municipality and town
- Location within Puebla (state) Location within Mexico
- Coordinates: 19°00′N 98°22′W
- Country: Mexico
- State: Puebla

Population (2020) (municipality)
  - Total: 11,498
- Time zone: UTC-6 (Zona Centro)
- Website: https://santaisabelcholula.gob.mx/

Santa Isabel Cholula is a town and municipality in the Mexican state of Puebla. In 2020, the municipality reported a population of 11,498, an increase of 43% from 2010.
