= Universidad de las Américas Puebla =

Private university in San Andrés Cholula, Mexico

University of the Americas Puebla
- Universidad de las Américas Puebla
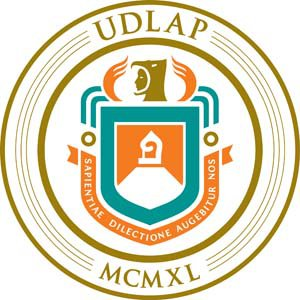
- Coat of Arms
- Motto: El amor a la sabiduría nos engrandecerá
- Motto in English: Love for wisdom will make us greater
- Type: Private university
- Established: 1940
- Rector: Luis Ernesto Derbez
- Faculty: 763
- Undergraduates: 8,008
- Location: San Andrés Cholula, Puebla, Mexico; 19.0543°N 98.2837°W
- Campus: Urban, 728,000 m^{2} (7,840,000 sq ft)
- Colors: Dark green & dark orange
- Mascot: Aztecas (Aztecs)
- Website: www.udlap.mx

Universidad de las Américas Puebla, commonly known as UDLAP (English: University of the Americas), is a Mexican private university located in San Andrés Cholula, near Puebla. The university is known for its programs in Finance, Arts and Humanities, Social sciences, Science and Engineering, and Business and Economics. It is considered to be one of the most prestigious universities in Latin America, having been ranked the best private and single-campus university in Mexico by the newspaper El Universal, as well as being one of the only seven universities in Latin America accredited by the Southern Association of Colleges and Schools. The UDLAP has also been very successful in Mexican collegiate sports; their teams are the Aztecas.

== History ==
=== 1940s ===
The Universidad de las Américas was founded in 1940 by Dr. Henry L. Cain and Dr. Paul V. Murray. Its original name was Mexico City College. The institution initially offered associate degrees in Arts and Sciences. In 1946 the Veterans Administration added the university to its list of "approved universities" which allowed veterans to study in the institution with financing from the United States' government. The Graduate School was created in 1947.

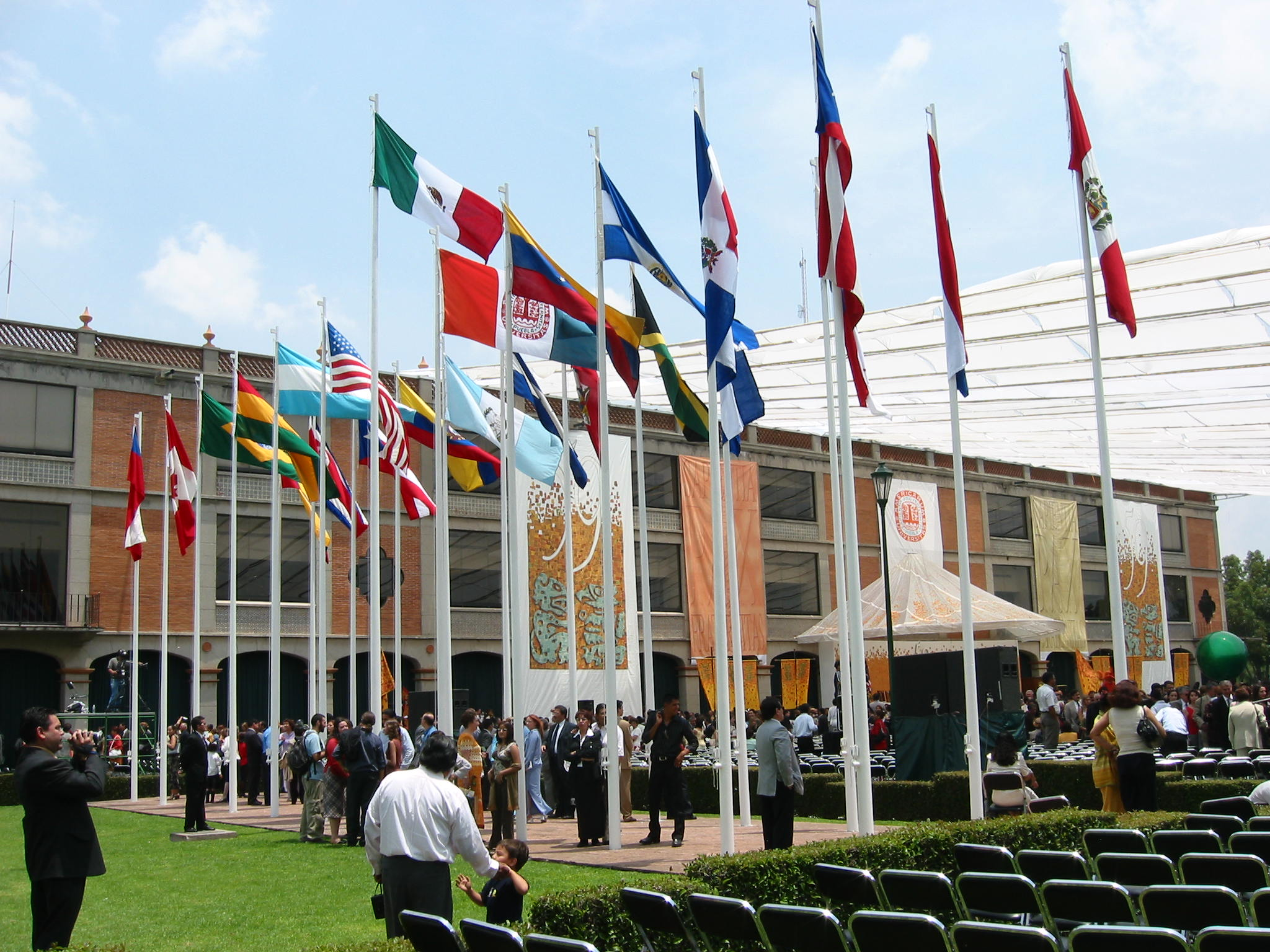
Square of the Flags, during a UDLAP graduation ceremony.

=== 1950s ===
The university was accepted by the Texas Association of Colleges, as an overseas institution in 1951. In 1959 the university became, only in that time over the Mexican Republic, a member of the Southern Association of Colleges and Schools (SACS).

=== 1960s ===
In 1963 the university changed its name to "University of the Americas". The institution was divided into three schools: Mexico City College, School of Arts and Sciences and the Graduate School. In 1967 the Mary Street Jenkins Foundation along with the International Development Agency provided the financial resources to build a new campus in the municipality of San Andres Cholula, Puebla. In 1968 the university decided to change its name to its Spanish translation "Universidad de las Américas".

=== 1970s ===
The Universidad de las Américas moved to its new campus in the city of Cholula, Puebla in 1970. Two more schools were created: the Institute of Technology (now the School of Engineering) in 1971 and the School of Economics and Business Sciences in 1978.

=== 1980s ===
The Institute of Advanced Studies was created in 1986 and in 1988 the School of Humanities and Social Sciences became two separate entities. In 1989 the School of Sciences was created.

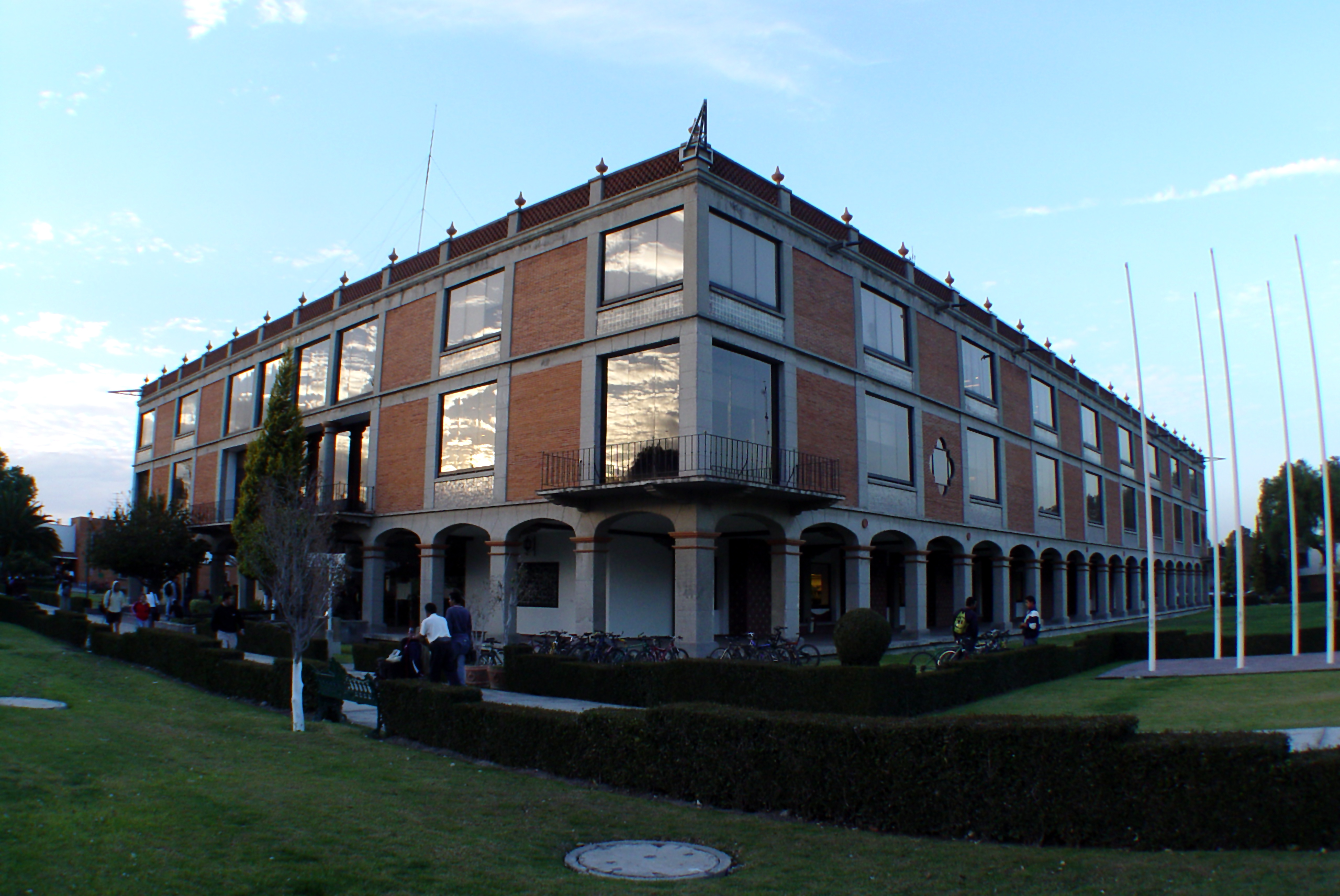
UDLAP Library, on campus.

=== 1990 ===
New Science Laboratories were built, as well as a new building for the School of Humanities. In 1994 it became one of the first universities in Mexico to have network voice and data connection. In 1997 the Library was remodeled and allowed digital access to students.

=== 2000s ===
New Chemical Engineering Laboratories were built. Two Doctoral programs (PhD) were created, one in Economics and the other in Computer Science. In 2002 the Institute of Public Politics was created as well as the Center for Regional Development. A new Optical Communications laboratory was built for the Research Center on Automation Technology. The CAIL, Language Learning and Research Complex (Conjunto para el Aprendizaje e Investigación en Lenguas) was finished in 2005. The Real Madrid Soccer school was established.

In 2006, 11 new bachelor's degrees and 9 master's degree programs opened, including the innovative programs at the undergraduate level in Nanotechnology and Molecular Engineering, and Culinary Arts. The launching of academic programs for 2007 in Health Sciences: Medicine, Odontology and Nursing was announced. In 2011, the treatment plant of residual waters was inaugurated.

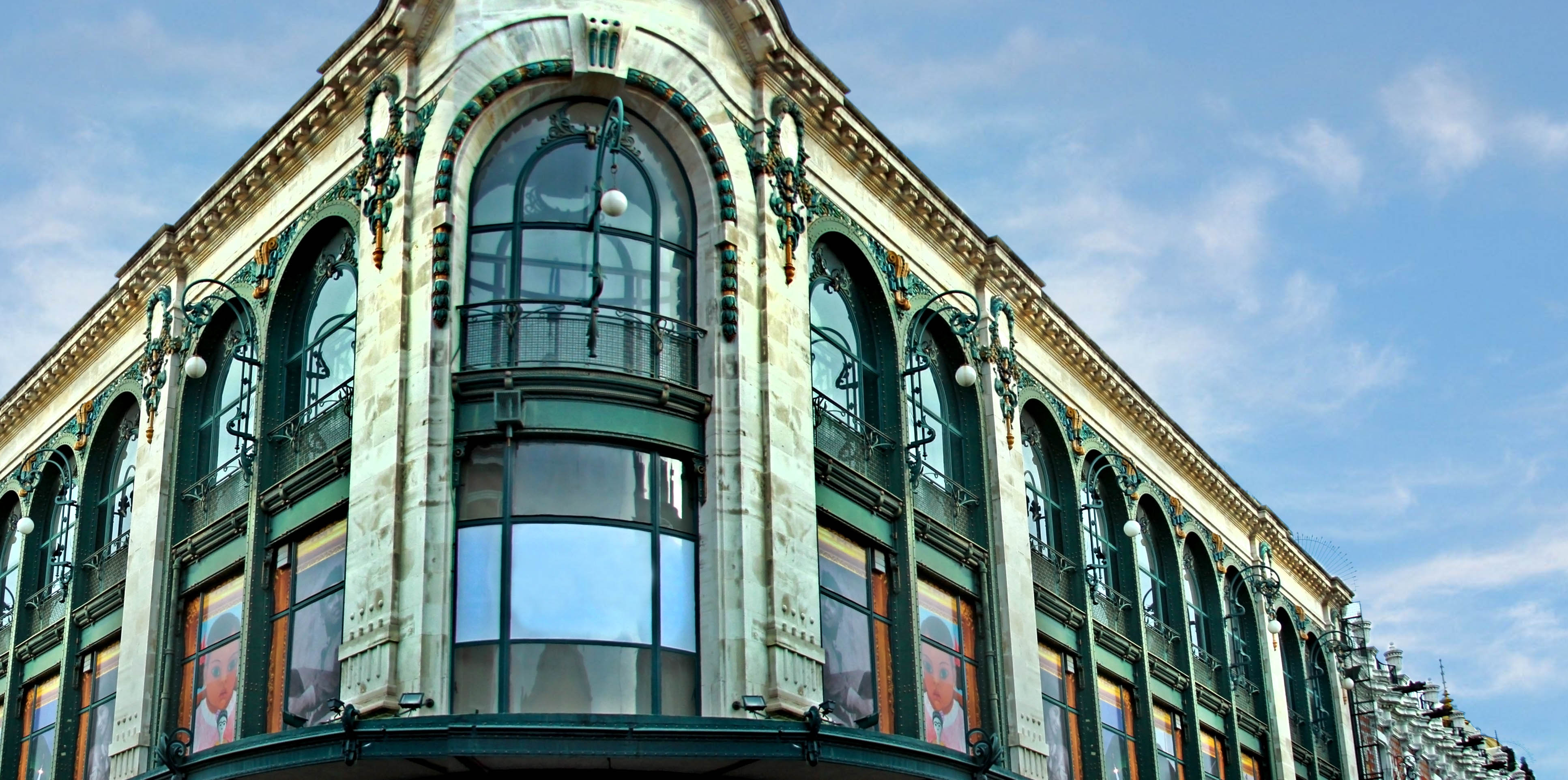
Capilla del Arte (Art Chapel) in the Historic Centre of Puebla.

==== Capilla del Arte ====
The Capilla del Arte (Art Chapel) was opened by UDLAP in the Historic Centre of Puebla district of the city of Puebla. It has a contemporary art gallery, cultural center, and auditorium, for cultural programs of music, dance, theater, film, literature, and arts to connect Puebla society with students, professors and artists. It is housed in a historical 1910s Art Nouveau style commercial building, originally constructed for the exclusive department store La Ciudad de México, and later housing another Mexican department store, Fábricas de Francia.

=== Conflict between boards of trustees and campus takeover ===
On July 12 2026, Armando Ríos Piter was presented as the new rector of the University of the Americas Puebla after being selected by the five members of its new board of trustees. Enrique Rodríguez, a spokesperson for the Jenkins family, disputed the appointment, arguing that it violated university statutes requiring a new rector to be chosen by members of the university's business council through a search committee.

== Campus ==
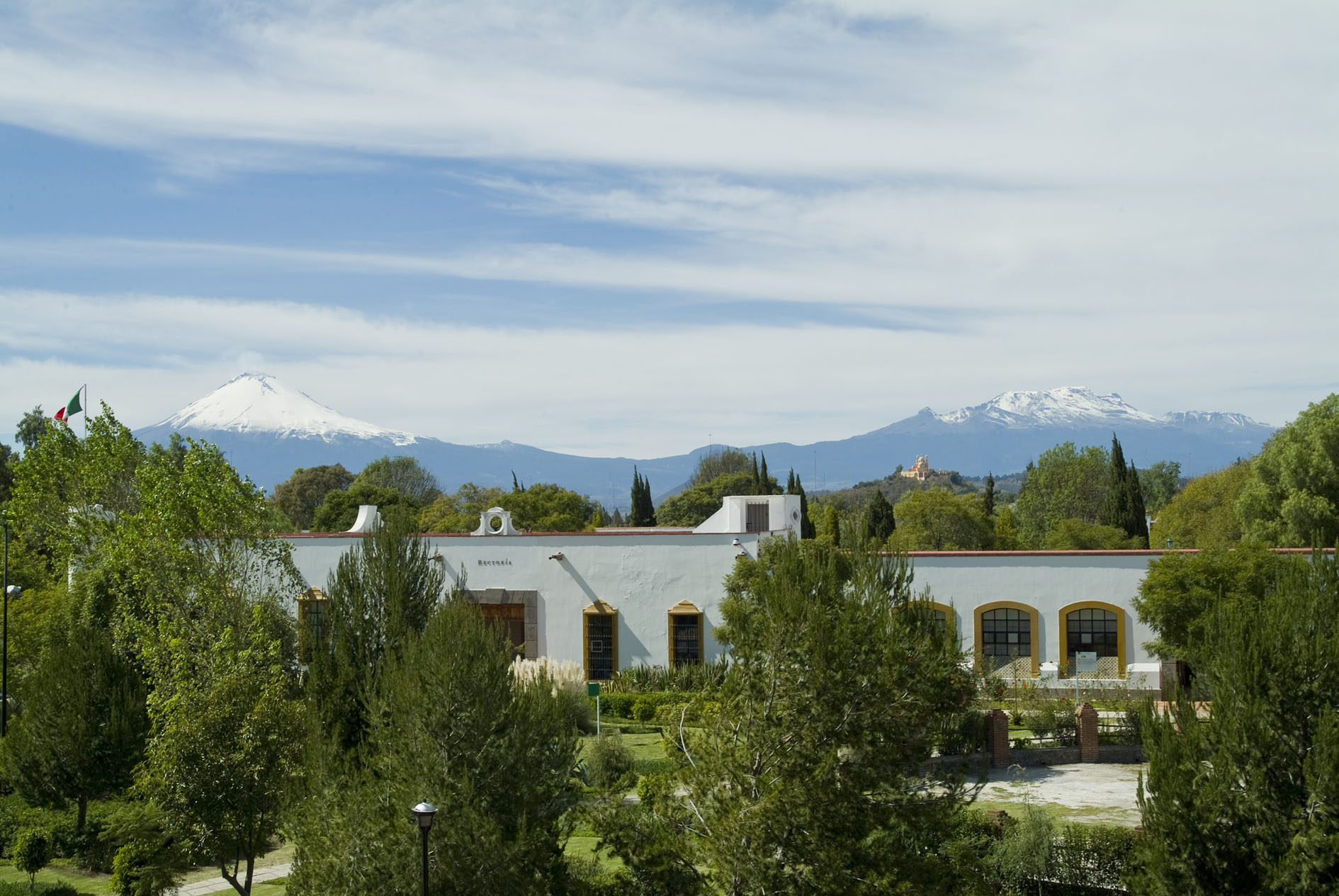
View of Popocatépetl and Iztaccíhuatl volcanos from the campus.

The campus is made up of 38 buildings on 180 acres (728,000 m^{2}), located 12 miles (19 km) west of Puebla's downtown, and less than 2 miles south of Cholula's downtown. The 38 buildings include 6 classroom buildings, 2 laboratory buildings, 3 on-campus dormitories, 1 off-campus dormitory, 2 soccer fields, 1 football field, 1 baseball field, 2 gymnasiums, tennis courts, 2 cafeterias, 1 library, 1 Student Center, 1 Auditorium, Offices and Professors' Housing. The campus was built on what was originally known as the Hacienda de Santa Catarina Mártir.

=== Housing ===
Unique to Mexico, the University of the Americas Puebla has a housing system very similar to those in the United States, their antecedents being the Yale and the Harvard housing systems. The university has four residential colleges, named after some of the most important people in the history of the UDLAP. The name of the four colleges are: The Cain Murray, the Ray Lindley, the Ignacio Bernal and the José Gaos colleges.

== Academics ==
=== Schools and departments ===
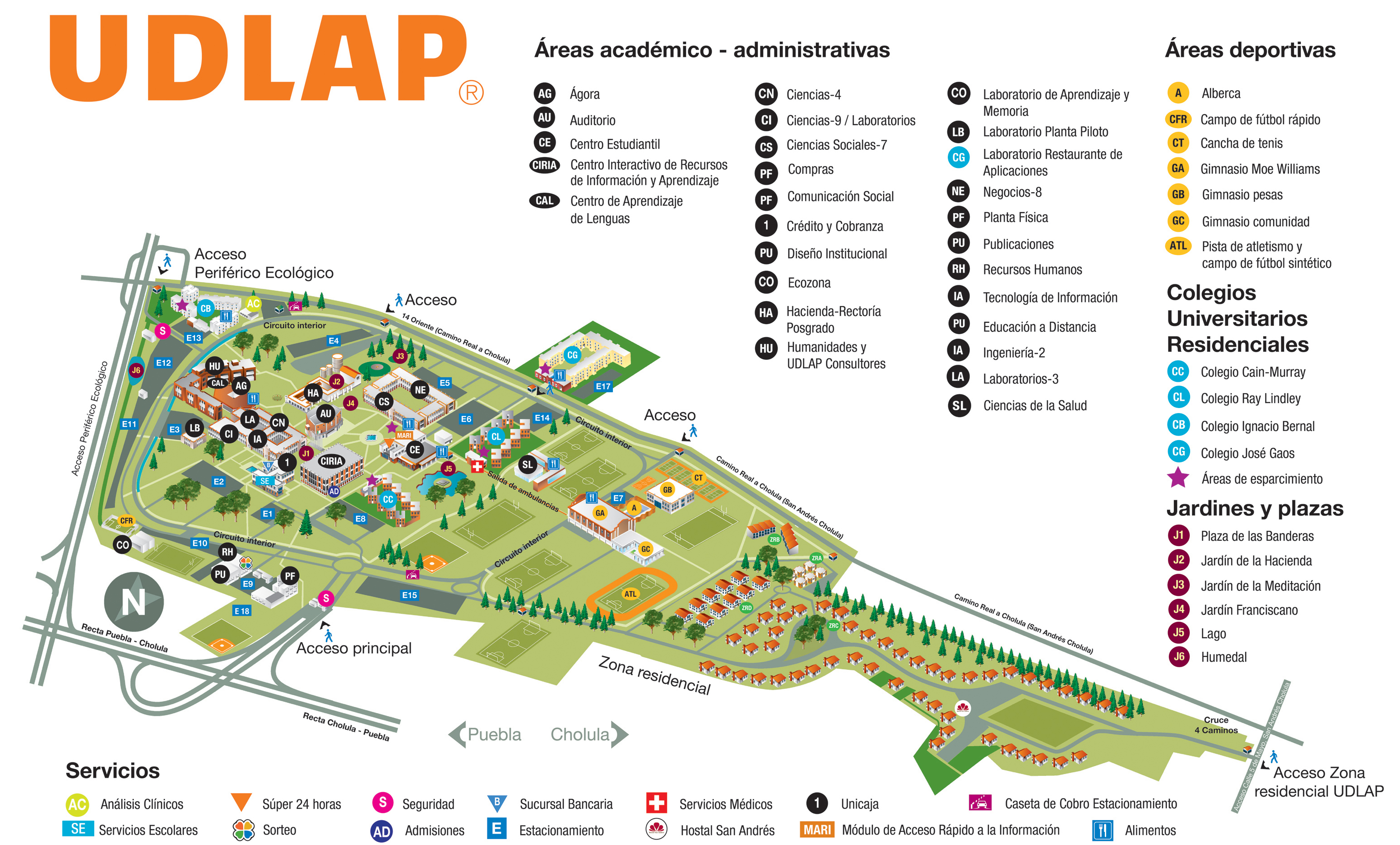
Map of the UDLAP−Universidad de las Américas Puebla campus.

As of December 2005, the School of Social Sciences and the School of Arts and Humanities were combined, as were the School of Engineering and the School of Sciences, to form two new schools as part of an institutional plan to offer students a broader education. Also, the Economics Department joined the Business School, which changed its name to the School of Economic and Management Sciences. In March 2006, this school again changed its name to its current form.

- School of Social Sciences (Escuela de Ciencias Sociales)
- School of Arts and Humanities (Escuela de Artes y Humanidades)
- School of Engineering (Escuela de Ingeniería)
- Science School (Escuela de Ciencias)
- Business and Economics School (Escuela de Negocios y Economía)
- School of Graduate Studies and Research
- Department of International Affairs (Departamento de Asuntos Internacionales)

=== Research ===
In Mexico, university research is generally done at public universities or at research-specific institutions. However UDLAP is one of the few private universities in the country to invest a reasonable amount of resources in research. Approximately 25% of the professors at the UDLAP are members of the National System of Researchers. They oversee several subjects at both the undergraduate and postgraduate levels, facilitating students' involvement in research projects beginning in the first semesters.

UDLAP's research work is reflected in scientific publications. Between 2009 and 2011 there were 364 works produced. There have been 330 publications, which include media articles, refereed articles, conference papers, book chapters and theses.

=== Rankings ===
In an annual study presented by the Mexican newspaper El Universal, the UDLAP was given the best grade of the universities in the Metropolitan area of Puebla, above universities such as UPAEP, BUAP or the Ibero Puebla. It is also the fourth-best private university in the country, and the ninth overall. The same study also reported that employers placed the university in second place, only after Mexico's National University, the UNAM, and that in the teacher's evaluation, the Puebla University was placed in third place, after the UNAM and the ITAM.

== Sports ==
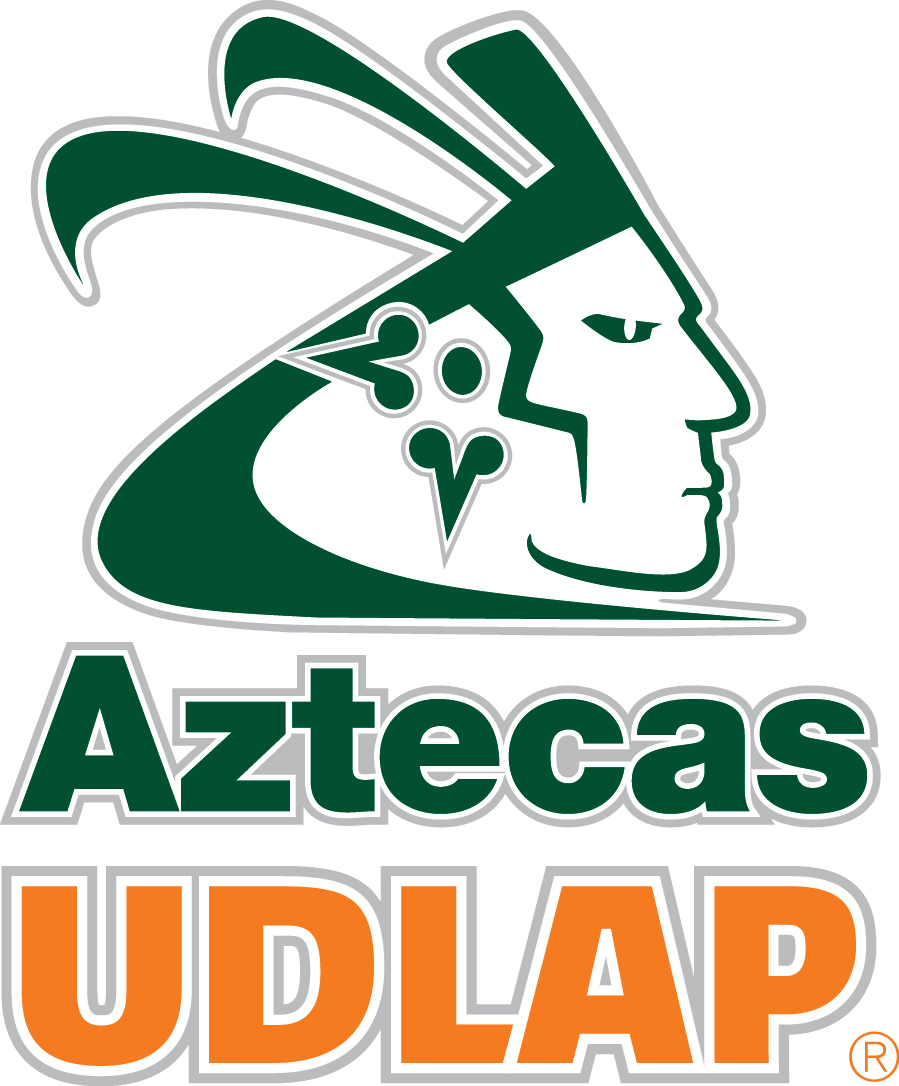
Aztecas UDLAP's logo

The Universidad de las Américas' sports teams are called the Aztecs. Their American football team has won three championships in the National League (ONEFA), and currently plays in the Premier League of the CONADEIP. The university was chosen as the site of the third Spanish Real Madrid youth overseas soccer school, and started activities on 7 February 2005. The UDLAP Men's basketball team is the 2006 Puebla State champions.

== Track & field ==
The most important athlete in the history of track & field is Herman Adam, a Mexican athlete born in Poza Rica, 2 August 1965. He has participated in the Olympic Games in Seoul 1988 and in Barcelona 1992, the World Athletics Championship Tokyo 1991, and other international competitions. His athletic disciplines include the 100m, 200m, 400m, long jump, and the 4 × 100 m and 4 × 400 m relays. His record 10.39sec in 100m at CONADEIP is still the world record.

Current teams representing UDLAP in national tournaments include:

- Football
- Basketball
- Soccer
- Volleyball
- Track and field
- Tae Kwon Do

== Accreditations ==
Besides being accredited by the Secretaría de Educación Pública (federal Secretariat of Education), the Universidad de las Américas is also accredited by:

- SACS - Southern Association of Colleges and Schools
- ABET - Engineering Accreditation Commission
- IFT - Institute of Food Technologies
- FIMPES - Federación de Instituciones Mexicanas Particulares de Educación Superior
- CACEI - Consejo de Acreditación de la Enseñanza de la Ingeniería, A.C.
- ACCECISO - Asociación para la Acreditación y Certificación en Ciencias Sociales
- CONAET - Consejo Nacional para la Calidad de la Educación Turística A. C.
- CACECA - Consejo de Acreditación en la Enseñanza de la Contaduría y Administración
- CACEI - Consejo de Acreditación de la Enseñanza de la INgeniería, A.C.
- COMAEM - Consejo para la Acreditaciónb de la Educación Médica, A.C.
- COMAEF - Consejo Mexicano para la Educación Farmacéutica, A.C.
- CONAED - Consejo para la Acreditación de la Enseñanza en Derecho
- CNEIP - Consejo Nacional para la Enseñanza e Investigación en Psicología, A. C.
- ANPADEH - Acreditadora Nacional de Programas de Arquitectura y Disciplinas de Espacio Habitable A.C.
- CAESA - Consejo para la Acreditación de la Educación Superior de las Artes
- COMAPROD - Consejo Mexicano para la Acreditación de Programas de Diseño
- COAPEHUM - Consejo para la Acreditación de Programas Educativos en Humanidades

== University facts ==
- Total Faculty: 763 members, 44% are full-time, 25% belong to the National System of Researchers (SNI)
- Total Students: more than 8,000; in 2004 1,647 new students were admitted, 250 of them were international. Forty percent of the students receive financial aid from the university.
- Study Abroad Programs: International study is offered in more than 300 universities in 30 countries.
- International Students: 1,114 international students came to the university as exchange students.

== Honoris Causa degrees ==
The following is a list of some of the Honoris Causa Degrees awarded by the Universidad de las Américas:

- Dr. William Richardson: Governor of New Mexico, United States
- Dr. José Julián Sidaoui: Deputy Governor of Bank of Mexico
- Dr. Mario Molina: Scientist and Nobel Prize Winner in Chemistry
- Dr. Enrique V. Iglesias: President of the Inter-American Development Bank

== University activities ==
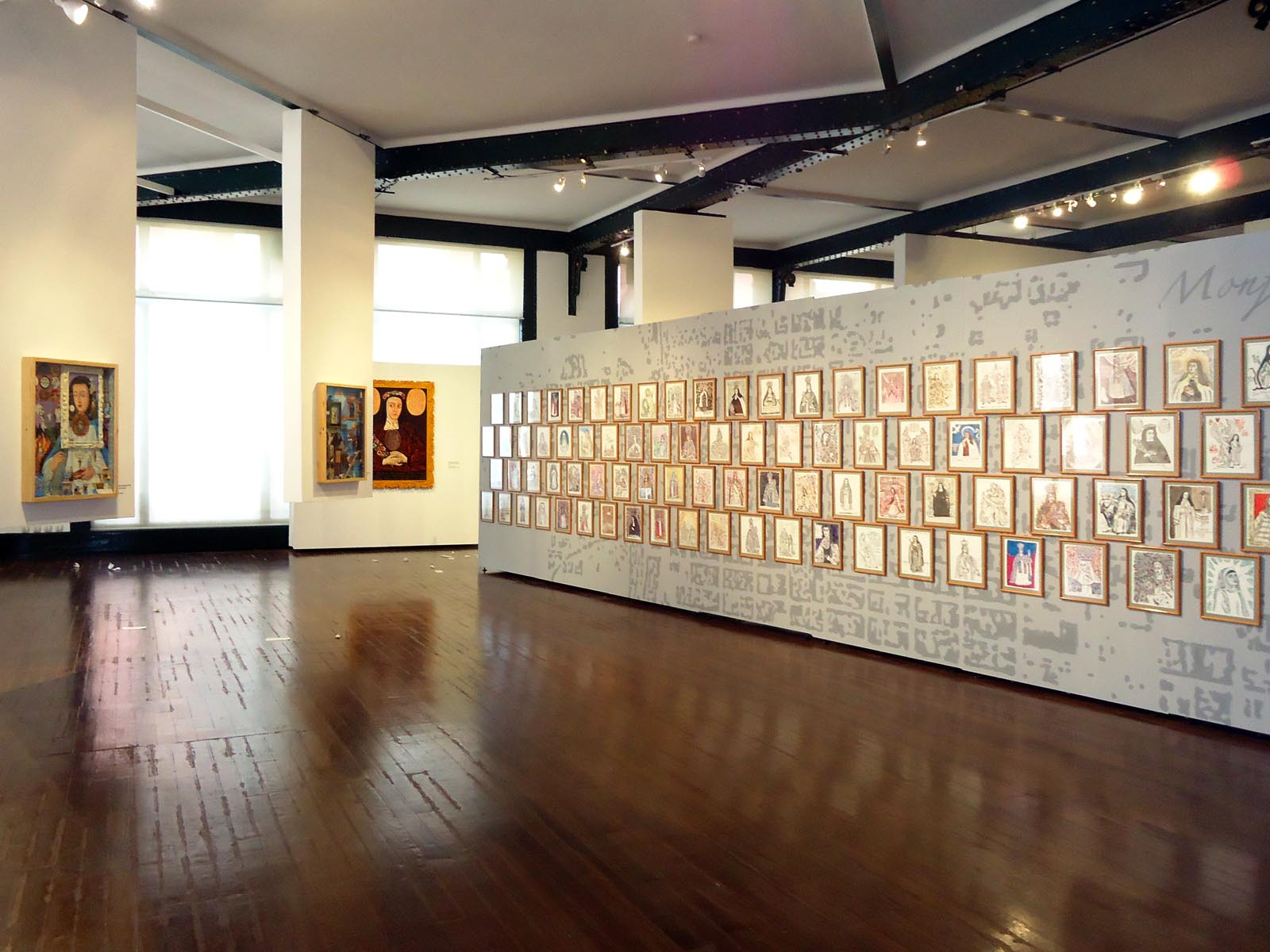
Exhibition in the Capillla del Arte UDLAP.

UDLAP offers a wide range of on-campus events such as academic, cultural and sporting events, which are open to both students and the local community. The UDLAP Nobel Conference is held two times a year. In this conference Nobel Prize Winners are invited to talk about their work and also their experience being Nobel Prize Winners.

On the cultural side UDLAP offers a wide range of activities in different locations. La Casa del Caballero Aguila and La Capilla del Arte UDLAP are two museums of the university offering concerts, art exhibitions and lectures.

Starting in the summer of 2007, UDLAP has been hosting a summer program for uplifting eighth to tenth graders through CTY, the Johns Hopkins Center for Talented Youth.

== Notable faculty ==
- Luis Ernesto Derbez, vice rector for academics in the 1980s
- Nora Lustig
- Roy R. Rubottom, Jr., president 1971–73
