= Bernhard Keppler =

German chemist and physician (born 1956)

Bernhard K. Keppler
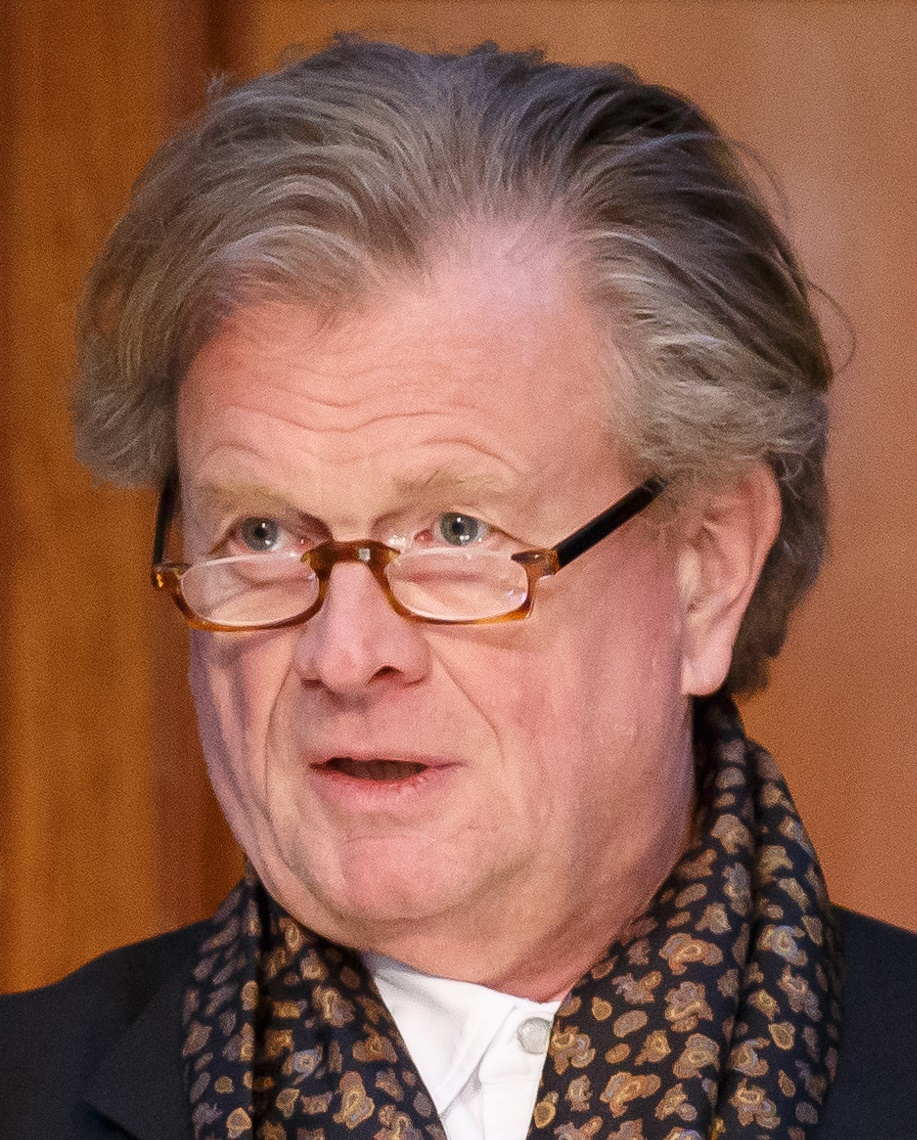
- Education: University of Heidelberg; DKFZ
- Awards: Heinz Maier-Leibnitz-Preis (1991)
- Scientific career
- Fields: Chemistry, Medicine
- Workplaces: University of Vienna
- Notable students: Christian Hartinger, Erwin Reisinger, Michael Reithofer, Christian Kowol, Georg Steinhauser

Bernhard K. Keppler, born 1956 in Hockenheim, is a German bioinorganic chemist and physician. He is chair of inorganic chemistry at the University of Vienna, head of the Institute of Inorganic Chemistry and dean of the Faculty of Chemistry.

== Education and career ==
Keppler earned his diploma's degree in chemistry in 1979, Ph.D. in chemistry from the University of Heidelberg in 1981, licence to practice medicine (approbation) in 1984 and second Ph.D. in medicine from German Cancer Research Center in 1986. He was promoted to university lecturer in inorganic chemistry in 1990 at the University of Heidelberg and assigned a chair in inorganic chemistry at University of Vienna with tenure in 1995. He is dean of the Faculty of chemistry since 2008, head of the inter-university research cluster Translational Cancer Therapy Research (in cooperation with the Medical University of Vienna and Walter Berger) and deputy head of the research network Chemistry, Microbiology and Environmental Systems Science (in cooperation with the Centre for Microbiology and Environmental Systems Science, University of Vienna, Michael Wagner (biologist)).

Keppler is author and co-author of more than 550 papers in peer-reviewed journals, (~20.000 citations, H-index 74), 16 invited reviews, 50 book chapters, and numerous patents. He has edited several books (e.g. Metal Complexes in Cancer Chemotherapy, VCH, Weinheim, 1993) and co-authored the textbook Principles of Bioinorganic Chemistry (University Science Books, 1994) with other scientists. He currently serves as an Associate Editor of the Anticancer Research. Keppler serves or has served on the editorial boards of numerous other journals.

== Research interests ==
Keppler's research activities are at the interface of inorganic chemistry and biology. A major focus of his activities is to understand, improve and develop anticancer drugs. He is a pioneer in investigating metal-based anticancer drugs and has developed multiple first-in-class compounds including KP1019, KP1339, and KP46 (IT-235, AP-002). BOLD-100, which is an anticancer drug related to the predecessors molecules KP1339 (NKP-1339, IT-139) and KP1019, is currently being investigated in clinical trials for advanced gastrointestinal cancers in combination with FOLFOX. KP46 is currently being tested in patients with advanced solid tumors. He also investigates environmental chemistry.
