= RAPTA =

Class of chemical compounds

RAPTA (ruthenium arene PTA) is a class of experimental cancer drugs. They consist of a central ruthenium(II) atom complexed to an arene group, chlorides, and 1,3,5-triaza-7-phosphaadamantane (PTA) forming an organoruthenium half-sandwich compound. Other related ruthenium anti-cancer drugs include NAMI-A, KP1019 and BOLD-100.

== Structure and properties ==
It is envisaged that RAPTA derivatives have the “piano stool” structure like others organometallic half-sandwich compound. This is observed by the crystal structure of RAPTA-C which exhibits the archetypal half-sandwich structure. The PTA ligand was designed to make the complexes more soluble in water, and the two labile chlorido ligands can exchange to aquo ligand in the presence of water.

== Synthesis ==
In a typical synthesis, [Ru(η^{6}-p-cymene)Cl_{2}]_{2} is reacted with 2 equivalents of PTA for 24 hours under reflux in methanol to yield to [Ru(η^{6}-p-cymene)Cl_{2}(pta)].

== RAPTA derivatives ==
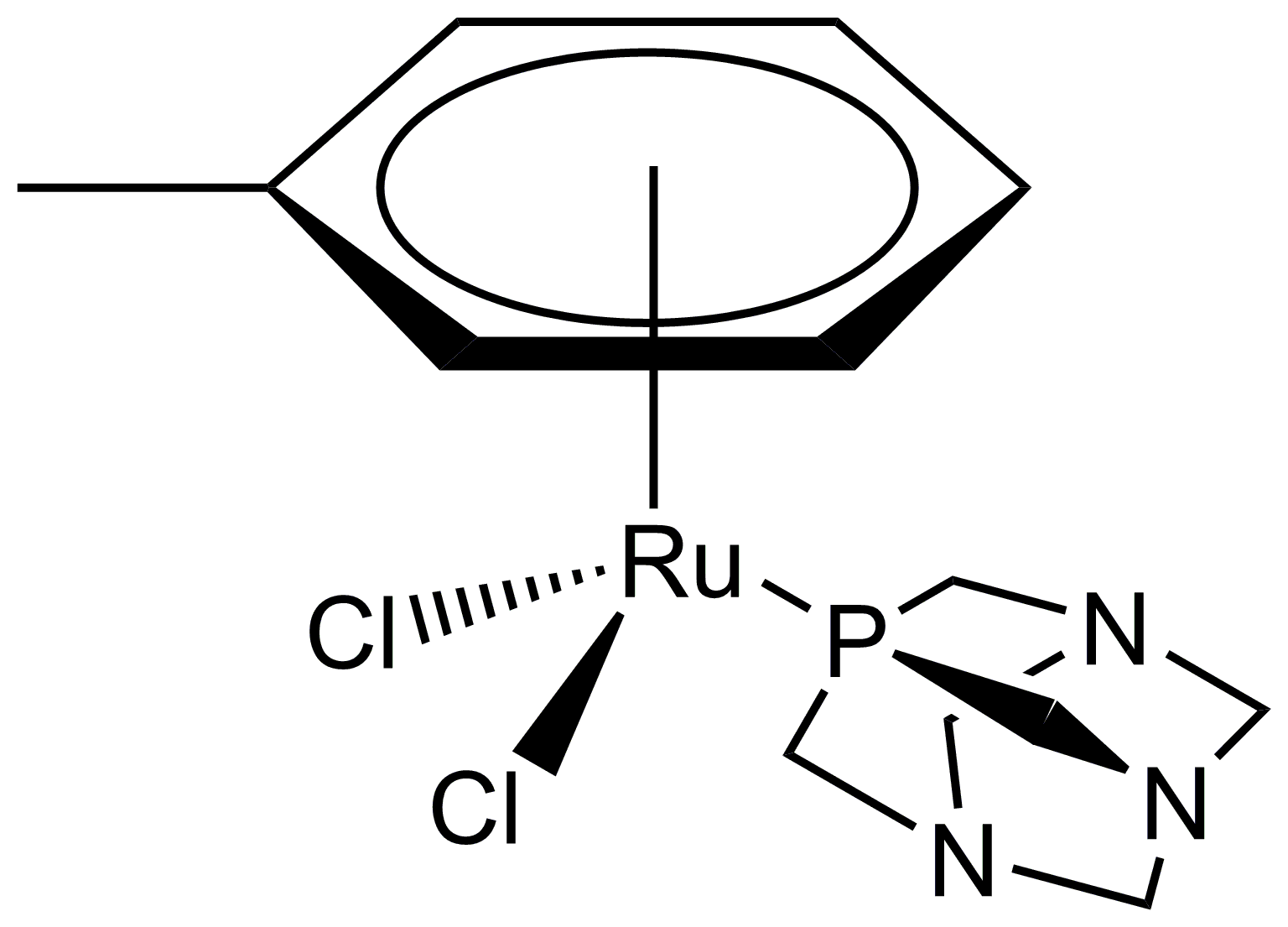
RAPTA-T

Several derivatives of RAPTA were synthesized, and two of the most notable are [Ru(η^{6}-p-cymene)Cl_{2}(pta)] (RAPTA-C) and [Ru(η^{6}-toluene)Cl_{2}(pta)] (RAPTA-T).

== Mode of action ==
RAPTA was anticipated to interact with DNA to target primary tumors, which mechanism is similar to that of cisplatin. Instead RAPTA compounds bind proteins, especially cathepsin B and thioredoxin reductase(TrxR). In vitro studies showed that cytotoxicity of RAPTA derivatives was much less as compared to cisplatin, and some RAPTA compounds are not even cytotoxic to healthy cells. Surprisingly, both RAPTA-C and RAPTA-T showed the ability to inhibit lung metastasis in mice bearing middle cerebral artery mammary carcinoma (by measuring the number and weight of the metastases), whilst having small effect on primary tumor. The only ruthenium complex which proves the ability against metastasis was NAMI-A, and this work has high practical application in chemotherapy since the removal of primary tumor can be done through frequent surgery while the number of metastasis treatments are limited.
