= Jan-Åke Gustafsson =

Swedish biochemist (1943–2026)

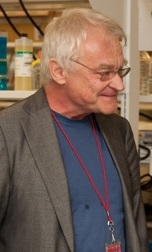
- Born: 4 August 1943; Stockholm, Sweden
- Died: 4 September 2026 (aged 83)
- Citizenship: Sweden
- Education: Karolinska institutet
- Scientific career
- Fields: Molecular biology, Medical nutrition
- Workplaces: University of Houston, Karolinska institutet
- Doctoral advisor: Sune Bergström, Nobel Prize in Medicine 1982

Jan-Åke Gustafsson (4 August 1943 – 4 September 2026) was a Swedish scientist and professor in biology, biochemistry and medical nutrition. When he decided to move to Houston, Texas, in 2008, the State of Texas decided to give a major US $5.5 million research grant to the University of Houston, enabling the establishment of the Center of Nuclear Receptors and Cell Signaling under the leadership of Jan-Åke Gustafsson. The grant was announced at a February 5, 2009, press conference by Rick Perry, Governor of Texas and running for the Republican nomination for President of the United States in the 2012 presidential election.

Recruiting top international scientists, world-leaders in their respective field, and providing them with grants to enable them to establish top scientific institutions in Texas, is part of the government of the State of Texas' vision to establish top-tier research and educational institutions in the state, institutions that will be able to rival the top institutions on the American East and West Coasts. The importance of research and scientific progress to the senior levels of the Texas government was illustrated by personal interest that governor Rick Perry took in the recruitment of professor Gustafsson and the establishment of the center.

Gustafsson held two parallel professorships: Robert A. Welch Professor of Biology and Biochemistry (80%) at the University of Houston's Department of Biology and Biochemistry, as well as Professor of Medical Nutrition (20%) at Karolinska Institutet in Stockholm, Sweden. Gustafsson was one of Europe's leading scientists in the fields of medicine and natural science.

He received numerous international and national scientific awards, honorary doctor- and professorships, e.g. Honorary professor of the Beijing University in Beijing, People's Republic of China; Honorary doctor of the University of Chongqing, Chongqing, PRC; Honorary Doctor of the University of Milan, Milan, Italy; the Lorenzini Foundation's Gold Medal, Lorenzini Foundation, Milan, Italy and the Nordic Fernström Prize, often referred to as the "Little Nobel Prize", the Fernström Foundation, Copenhagen, Denmark.

Gustafsson was one of the scientists in Sweden that received the largest annual research and science grants, i.e. government- and private funding, for his research projects.

He is most well known for his longstanding accomplishments in the field of nuclear receptors, including his discovery of the previously unknown estrogen receptor beta. His work at the University of Houston was focused on establishing academic and industry collaborations with the goal of finding new treatments for diseases, such as cancer, diabetes and metabolic syndrome.

Gustafsson received his PhD from the Karolinska institutet in 1968, followed by an MD from the same university in 1971.

== Founder of the Novum Research Park in Flemingsberg and listed company Karo Bio AB ==
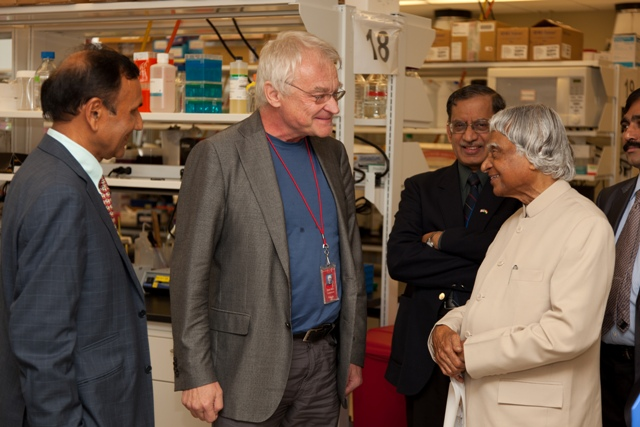
Jan-Åke Gustafsson and APJ Abdul Kalam at the University of Houston Center for Nuclear Receptors and Cell Signaling. Kalam served as the 11th President of India from 2002 to 2007. He had an academic background as an Aerospace engineer, professor, and chancellor of the Indian Institute of Space Science and Technology (IIST) and was awarded the Bharat Ratna, India's highest civilian honor in 1997.

Gustafsson was the founder of the Novum Research Park, a research park geared towards biotechnology and medicine at the Karolinska institutet, campus Huddinge. He was also one of the leading proponents behind locating the Södertörn University College, southern Stockholm's new university, to Huddinge. Institutions of higher learning and research have traditionally been located to the northern parts of the Stockholm county. Establishing a leading research park and a new university in Huddinge, with special reference to Flemingsberg, is part of a broader vision of achieving a regional balance: stimulating economic growth and enabling southern Stockholm to catch up with the wealthier northern parts of the county. Since the establishment of the research park and university was initiated, several other government and private organizations have followed suit, establishing a presence in the area. In 1997, Stockholm Syd-Flemingsberg, southern Stockholm's major national- and regional-train hub was established in the area, giving excellent communications with central Stockholm.

The State of Texas government hired him for the establishment of a new major research center in a similar guise, at the University of Houston. Jan-Åke Gustafsson was the founder of Karo Bio AB, a biotechnology company listed on the Stockholm Stock Exchange and based in the Novum Research Park. He was also the coordinator for the European Union-financed research network CASCADE.

== Memberships ==
Gustafsson was a member of the Royal Swedish Academy of Sciences since 1997 and the Royal Swedish Academy of Engineering Sciences since 1998. He was a member of the American Academy of Arts and Sciences since 2002 and Foreign Honorary Member of the United States National Academy of Sciences since 2004. He was also a member of the Nobel Assembly of the Karolinska Institutet, having served as its chairman from 2002 to 2004.

Jan-Åke Gustafsson was a member of the board of several leading international scientific journals, including Steroids, The Journal of Steroid Biochemistry and Molecular Biology, Molecular Endocrinology, Breast Cancer Research and Treatment, The Prostate, Anticancer Research, Japanese Journal of Cancer Research, Journal of Molecular Medicine, Molecular Pharmacology, Cell Metabolism, Experimental Biology and Medicine and the International Journal of Oncology.

== Scientific discoveries ==
In the mid-1990s, Gustafsson's research group at the Karolinska Institutet discovered estrogen receptor-beta, which plays a pivotal role in the function of the brain, lungs, and immune system. Today, drugs are being developed to stimulate that receptor to battle a number of diseases, including breast, prostate and lung cancers. In some instances, the abnormal cell division that creates cancerous tumors can be slowed down or stopped by stimulating the receptor.

Additional discoveries include early demonstration of the three-domain structure of nuclear receptors, specific binding of nuclear receptors to DNA, discovery of steroid response element, cloning of the first nuclear receptor fragment, first determination a 3-D structure of a nuclear receptor (the DNA binding domain of the glucocorticoid receptor), discovery of the first physiological ligand of a nuclear receptor (fatty acids for the peroxisome proliferator activated receptor alpha), discovery of liver X receptor beta (LXRβ), discovery of estrogen receptor beta (ERβ) and unravelling of some of their functions.

Gustafsson also is credited with 12 patents, more than 1,400 peer-reviewed publications and more than 70,000 citations.

== Death ==
Gustafsson died on 4 September 2026, at the age of 83.

== Awards and recognitions ==
- Honorary doctor in medicine, University of Turku, Finland, 2011
- Nordic Fernström Prize, Denmark, 2009
- Honorary doctor in Medicinal and Pharmaceutical Chemistry, University of Milan, Milan, Italy, 2008
- Honorary Professor, University of Beijing, People's Republic of China, 2008
- Honorary Professor, University of Chongqing, People's Republic of China, 2007
- Descartes Research Prize for excellence in scientific collaborative research, 2005
- Bristol- Meyers Squibb/Mead Johnson Award for Nutrition Research, 2004
- Foreign Honorary Member, United States National Academy of Sciences, United States, 2002
- Fred Conrad Koch Award, Endocrine Society USA, United States, 2002
- Lorenzini Gold Medal, Fondazione Giovanni Lorenzini (Giovanni Lorenzini Medical Science Foundation), Milan, Italy, 2001
- Foreign Honorary Member, American Academy of Arts and Sciences, United States, 2000
- European Medal, British Society for Endocrinology, United Kingdom, 2000
- Fogarty Scholar, National Institutes of Health, United States, 1999
