= Daisho (Drosophila peptide) =

Antimicrobial peptide immune gene of fruit flies

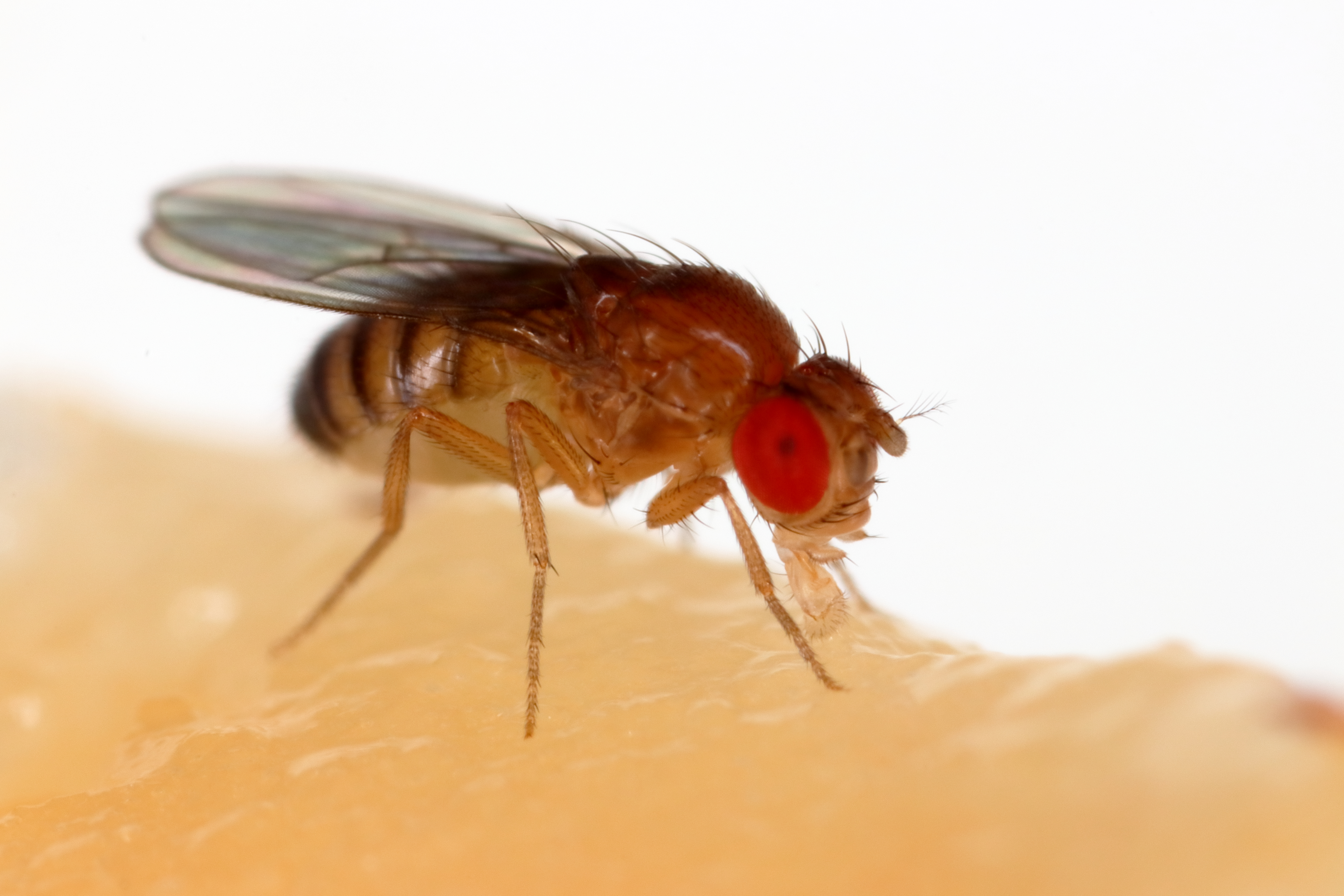
- The fruit fly, Drosophila melanogaster

Identifiers
- Organism: Drosophila melanogaster
- Symbol: Dso
- UniProt: P82705
Search for
- Structures: Swiss-model
- Domains: InterPro

Daisho (Dso) is an antimicrobial peptide gene family of the fruit fly Drosophila melanogaster. Two Daisho genes (Dso1, Dso2) are encoded in tandem in the fruit fly genome, one shorter than the other. This pair of genes with different length was named "Daisho" in reference to Daisho Japanese swords, which come in pairs with one shorter than the other.

The Daisho genes are regulated by Drosophila Toll-like receptor signalling. Daisho peptides protect flies against filamentous fungi, particularly Fusarium and also Aspergillus. Daisho peptides are part of the Drosophila antifungal effector peptide response, which includes the gene families Bomanin, Drosomycin, Metchnikowin, and Baramicin.
