= Ruthenium anti-cancer drugs =

Ruthenium anti-cancer drugs are coordination complexes of ruthenium complexes that have anticancer properties. They promise to provide alternatives to platinum-based drugs for anticancer therapy. No ruthenium anti-cancer drug has been commercialized.

Since 1979, when Cisplatin entered clinical trials, there has been continuing interest in alternative metal-based drugs. The leading ruthenium-based candidates are BOLD-100 and TLD-1433. Other ruthenium based therapeutics that have been tested clinically include NAMI-A and KP1019. The first ruthenium-based drug to enter clinical trials was NAMI-A. More ruthenium drugs are still under development. Ruthenium complexes as anticancer drugs were originally designed to mimic platinum drugs for targeting DNA, but emerging ruthenium compounds have shown a variety of mechanisms of actions, which include ROS generation, and as Endoplasmic reticulum stress agents.

== Properties of ruthenium complexes ==
Ruthenium has numerous properties that qualify it as an antineoplastic drug contender.

=== Oxidation states and geometry ===
Ruthenium complexes typically adopt oxidation states II and III The geometry assumed by most ruthenium complexes is octahedral, which differs from the square planar molecular geometry typical for platinum(II). The presence of six ligands allows for tuning of the complexes' electronic and steric properties. Its partially filled 4d sub-shell allows it to form complexes that are useful for a wide variety of applications including catalysis, electronics, photochemistry, biosensors and anticancer drugs.

=== Ligand exchange rates ===
The rate of ligand exchange for ruthenium complexes is relatively slow in comparison with other transition metal complexes. The range of these exchange rates is around 10^{−2} to 10^{−4} s^{−1} which is on the scale of an average cell's lifetime, giving the drug high kinetic stability and minimizing side reactions. This allows the Ru complex to remain intact as it approaches the target as well as remain viable throughout its interaction with the cells. It is also possible through ligand variation to precisely tune the exchange kinetics, allowing a large degree of control over the complex's stability.

=== Activation ===
The theory of "activation by reduction" is based on the understanding that Ru(II) complexes are generally more reactive than Ru(III) complexes. As cancer cells are generally growing and multiplying much more rapidly than normal healthy cells, this creates an environment that is less oxygen-rich due to the raised metabolic rate. When this is paired with the tendency of cancerous cells to contain higher levels of glutathione and a lower pH, a chemically reducing environment is created. This theoretically allows for ruthenium complexes to be administered as much less active, non-toxic Ru(III) compounds (as a prodrug), which can be activated solely at the site of the cancerous cells. The reduction is thought to occur by mitochondrial proteins or microsomal single electron transfer proteins, though it may also occur by trans-membrane electron transport systems which reside outside the cell – implying that entry to the cancerous cells may not be required for the drug to be effective. In theory it is also possible for the ruthenium compounds to be oxidized back to their inactive form if it leaves the cancerous environment. This phenomenon remains a theory, and has been primarily demonstrated in vitro.

Although this theory is attractive, convenient, and grounded in fundamental ruthenium chemistry, this theory falls apart when investigated under in vivo. A direct contradiction of this theory was proven using XANES and BOLD-100. This study examined several tissues (tumor included) of SW480-bearing mice for 24 hours after administration of BOLD-100. This study showed that the Ru(III) oxidation state persists, and since BOLD-100 has significant biological effects within that 24-hour time point, this directly contradicts the "activation by reduction" mechanism.

=== Biological transportation ===
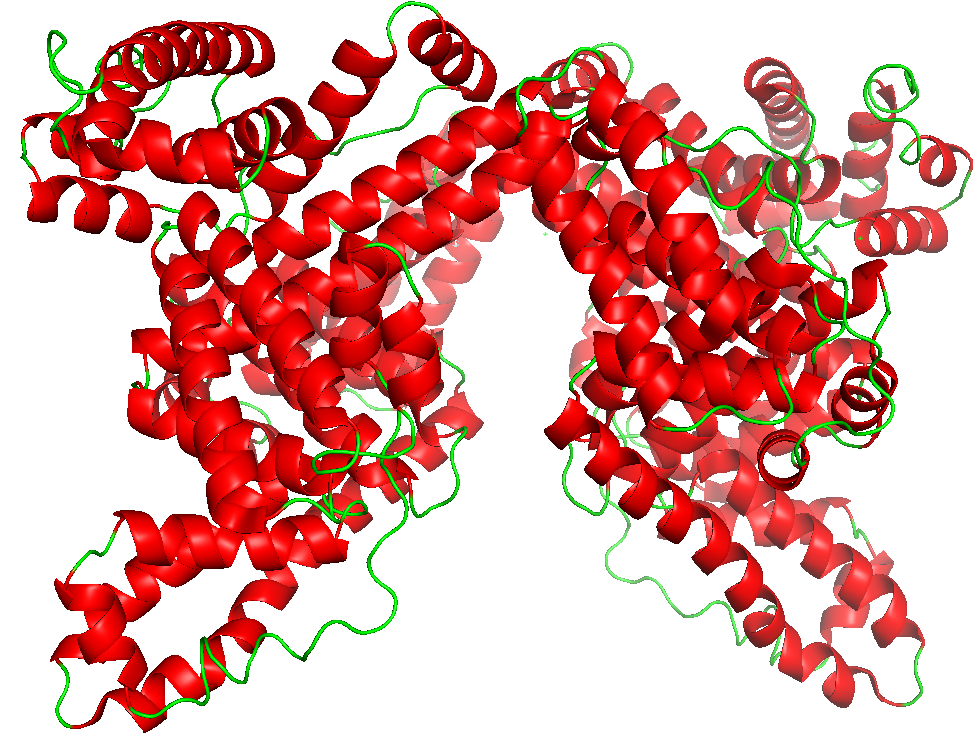
3D rendering of human serum albumin (HSA)

The ruthenium complex BOLD-100 binds to serum albumin as established by X-ray crystallography. This adduct is proposed to facilitate uptake. The levels of serum albumin in these cancerous cells are greatly increased, which may contribute to the lower toxicity associated to the ruthenium drugs in comparison to platinum.

== Prospective ruthenium anti-cancer drugs ==
=== BOLD-100 ===
BOLD-100, or sodium trans-[tetrachlorobis (1H-indazole)ruthenate(III)], is the most clinically advanced ruthenium-based therapeutic. As of November 2021, BOLD-100 was being tested in a Phase 1b clinical trial in patients with advanced gastrointestinal cancers in combination with the chemotherapy regimen FOLFOX.

=== NAMI ===
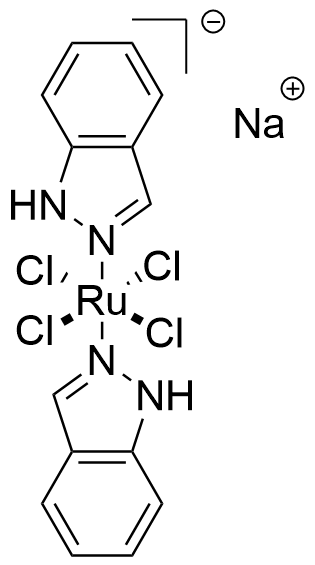
Chemical structure of sodium trans-[tetrachlorobis (1H-indazole)ruthenate(III)] (BOLD-100)

NAMI {Na[trans-RuCl_{4}](DMSO)(imida)]} and NAMI-A {H_{2}Im[trans-RuCl_{4}(DMSO)HIm[imidH] are salts that were investigated as anti-cancer drugs. NAMI-A is considered a pro-drug and is inactive at physiological pH of 7.4. Cancer cells generally contain a lower oxygen concentration as well as higher levels of glutathione and a lower pH than normal tissues creating a reducing environment. Upon entering cancer cells NAMI-A is activated by the reduction of Ru(III) to Ru(II) to form the active anti-cancer agent.

=== KP1019 ===
KP1019, trans-tetrachlorobis(indazole)ruthenate(III), has an octahedral structure with two trans N-donor indazole and four chloride ligands in the equatorial plane. It has a low solubility in water, which makes it difficult to transport in the bloodstream. Instead KP1339 is used as a preparation of KP1019 in clinical trials, since it has a better solubility as a sodium salt.

KP1019 reacts with proteins and other N-donors.

Especially transferrin and albumin are good binding partners. The overall method of action for KP1019 needs to be supported further.

Tumor cells have a high requirement of iron, which results in a large concentration of transferrin. Ru(III) complexes bind to transferrin and are proposed to interfere with iron uptake.

=== RAPTA ===
RAPTA compounds are ruthenium–arene complexes bearing the 1,3,5-triaza-7-phosphatricyclo-[3.3.1.1]decane ligand. The complex has a piano stool geometry. The PTA ligand confers water solubility, and the two chloride ligands are labile. RAPTA compounds have low general toxicity that apparently lowers the side-effects associated with chemotherapy.

=== RAED ===
Ruthenium diamine complexes have been investigated as potential anticancer drugs. RAED compounds are ruthenium–arene complexes bearing the 1,2-ethylenediamine ligand.

The ruthenium diamine complexes form adducts with guanine. Methylation or substitution on en-NH, which prevent the hydrogen bonding, can lead to the loss of cytotoxic activity of the complex toward cancer cell. The ethylenediamine ligand suppresses reactions of the complex with amino acid residues. The Ru(II) complexes have a higher affinity to DNA in the presence of protein than the Ru(III) compounds, such as NAMI-A.
