= Bomanin =

Antimicrobial peptide-like immune gene of fruit flies

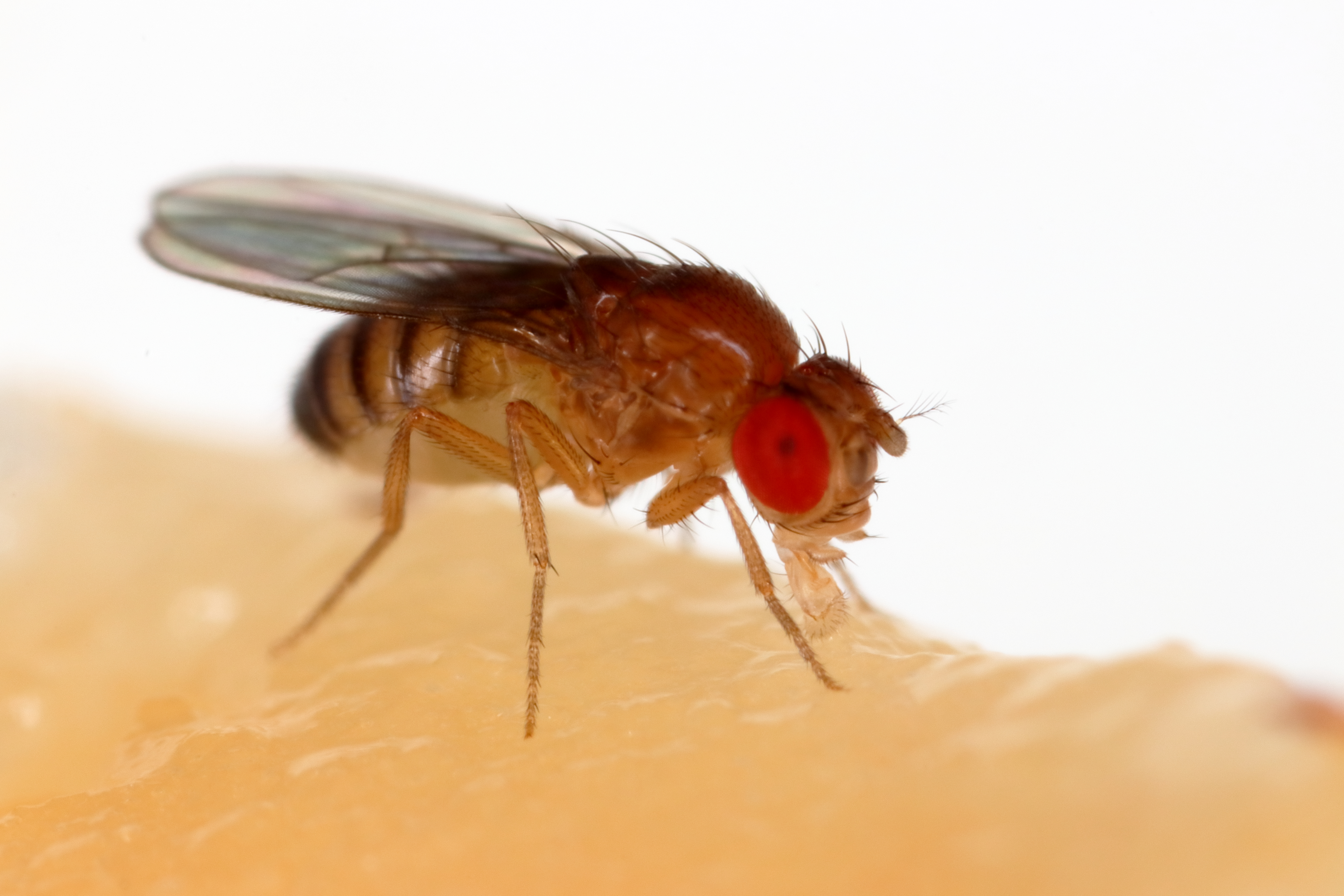
- The fruit fly, Drosophila melanogaster

Identifiers
- Organism: Drosophila melanogaster
- Symbol: Bom
- UniProt: P82706
Search for
- Structures: Swiss-model
- Domains: InterPro

The Bomanin gene family encodes a group of immune peptides that are essential for Drosophila fruit fly defence against infection by many pathogens.

The gene family is named in honour of Hans G. Boman, for his contributions to innate immunity and the discovery of antimicrobial peptides. While Bomanins are essential for survival after infection by many kinds of Gram-positive bacteria and pathogenic fungi, the reason they are key to defence may be because Bomanins promote resilience to pathogen toxins, and not because they directly suppress pathogens. However fly hemolymph (blood) loses its fungicidal activity in the absence of Bomanins, suggesting these peptides are also somehow needed to turn the hemolymph into an antimicrobial environment.

== See also ==
- Hans G. Boman
- Antimicrobial peptides
- Drosomycin
- Metchnikowin
- Baramicin
- Daisho
- The Toll immunity signalling pathway
