= 10th federal electoral district of Puebla =

Federal electoral district of Mexico

Puebla's 10th
- Electoral district of the Chamber of Deputies of Mexico

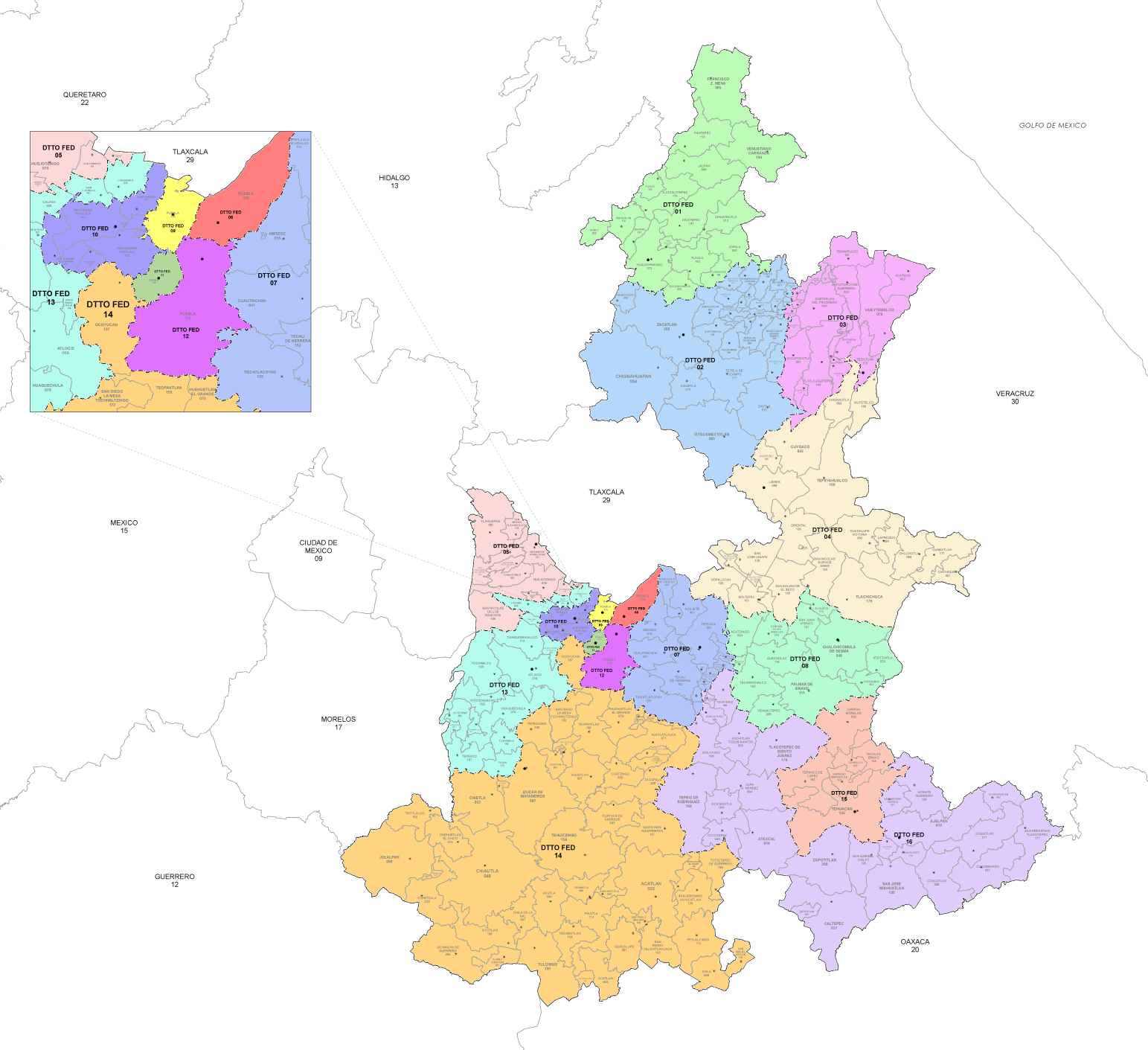
- 10th district since 2023

Incumbent
- Member: Karina Pérez Popoca
- Party: ▌Morena
- Congress: 66th (2024–2027)

District
- State: Puebla
- Head town: Cholula de Rivadavia
- Coordinates: 19°04′N 98°18′W
- Covers: Cuautlancingo, San Andrés Cholula, San Gregorio Atzompa, San Jerónimo Tecuanipan, San Pedro Cholula
- PR region: Fourth
- Precincts: 113
- Population: 422,497 (2020 census)

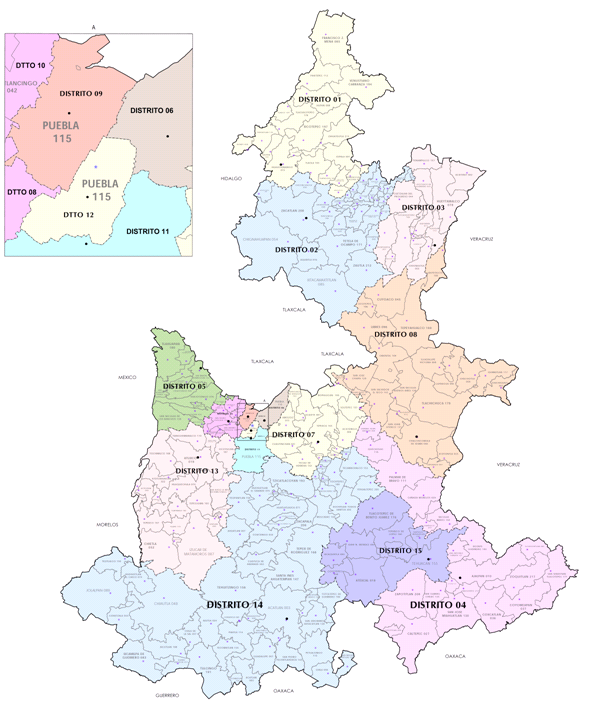
Puebla's districts in 2017–2022

The 10th federal electoral district of Puebla (Spanish: Distrito electoral federal 10 de Puebla) is one of the 300 electoral districts into which Mexico is divided for elections to the federal Chamber of Deputies and one of 16 such districts in the state of Puebla.

It elects one deputy to the lower house of Congress for each three-year legislative session by means of the first-past-the-post system. Votes cast in the district also count towards the calculation of proportional representation ("plurinominal") deputies elected from the fourth region.

The current member for the district, elected in the 2024 general election, is María Fabiola Karina Pérez Popoca of the National Regeneration Movement (Morena).

== District territory ==
Under the 2023 districting plan adopted by the National Electoral Institute (INE), which is to be used for the 2024, 2027 and 2030 federal elections, Puebla's congressional seat allocation rose from 15 to 16. The 10th district is in the Puebla Metropolitan Area and covers 113 electoral precincts (secciones electorales) across five of the state's municipalities:

- Cuautlancingo, San Andrés Cholula, San Gregorio Atzompa, San Jerónimo Tecuanipan and San Pedro Cholula.

The head town (cabecera distrital), where results from individual polling stations are gathered together and tallied, is the city of Cholula de Rivadavia. The district reported a population of 422,497 in the 2020 census.

== Previous districting schemes ==
Evolution of electoral district numbers
	1974	1978	1996	2005	2017	2023
Puebla	10	14	15	16	15	16
Chamber of Deputies	196	300				

2017–2022

From 2017 to 2022, when Puebla was assigned 15 congressional seats, the district's head town was at Cholula de Rivadavia and it covered 7 municipalities:
- Cuautlancingo, San Andrés Cholula, San Gregorio Atzompa, San Jerónimo Tecuanipan and San Pedro Cholula, as in the 2022 plan, plus Coronango and Juan C. Bonilla .

2005–2017

Under the 2005 plan, the district was one of 16 in Puebla. Its head town was at Cholula and it covered 9 municipalities:
- Coronango, Cuautlancingo, Juan C. Bonilla, San Andrés Cholula, San Gregorio Atzompa, San Jerónimo Tecuanipan and San Pedro Cholula, as in the 2017 plan, plus Ocoyucan and Tlaltenango.

1996–2005

Between 1996 and 2005, Puebla had 15 districts. The 10th covered 11 municipalities, with its head town at Atlixco in the west of the state.
- Atlixco, Atzitzihuacán, Nealtican, Ocoyucan, San Andrés Cholula, San Gregorio Atzompa, San Jerónimo Tecuanipan, San Pedro Cholula, Santa Isabel Cholula, Tianguismanalco and Tochimilco.

1978–1996

The districting scheme in force from 1978 to 1996 was the result of the 1977 electoral reforms, which increased the number of single-member seats in the Chamber of Deputies from 196 to 300. Under that plan, Puebla's seat allocation rose from 10 to 14. The 10th district's head town was at Huauchinango in the extreme north of the state and it comprised 17 municipalities in the Sierra Norte region.

== Deputies returned to Congress ==
(Mexico) National parties
- Current
- PAN
- PRI
- PT
- PVEM
- MC
- Morena
- PAZ
- Somos
- Defunct or local only
- PLM
- PNR
- PRM
- PNM
- PP
- PPS
- PARM
- PFCRN
- CON
- PANAL
- PSD
- PES
- PES
- PRD

Puebla's 10th district
Election	Deputy	Party	Term	Legislature
1916	Pastor Rouaix		1916–1917	Constituent Congress of Querétaro
...
1973	Guillermo Jiménez Morales	Institutional Revolutionary Party	1973–1976	49th Congress
1976	Adolfo Rodríguez Juárez	Institutional Revolutionary Party	1976–1979	50th Congress
1979	Alfonso Zegbe Sanen	Institutional Revolutionary Party	1979–1982	51st Congress
1982	Mariano Piña Olaya	Institutional Revolutionary Party	1982–1985	52nd Congress
1985	Carlos Adolfo Palafox Vázquez	Institutional Revolutionary Party	1985–1988	53rd Congress
1988	Narciso Alberto Amador Leal	Institutional Revolutionary Party	1988–1991	54th Congress
1991	Alberto Jiménez Arroyo	Institutional Revolutionary Party	1991–1994	55th Congress
1994	Cándido Pérez Verduzco	Institutional Revolutionary Party	1994–1997	56th Congress
1997	Jesús Eleazar Camarillo Ochoa (Note: Camarillo Ochoa died in office on 30 January 1999.); Alejandro Oaxaca Carreón	Institutional Revolutionary Party	1997–1999; 1999–2000	57th Congress
2000	Neftalí Salvador Escobedo Zoletto	National Action Party (Mexico)	2000–2003	58th Congress
2003	Rogelio Alejandro Flores Mejía	National Action Party (Mexico)	2003–2006	59th Congress
2006	Dolores María del Carmen Parra Jiménez	National Action Party (Mexico)	2006–2009	60th Congress
2009	Juan Pablo Jiménez Concha	Institutional Revolutionary Party	2009–2012	61st Congress
2012	Julio César Lorenzini Rangel	Institutional Revolutionary Party	2012–2015	62nd Congress
2015	Miguel Ángel Huepa Pérez	National Action Party (Mexico)	2015–2018	63rd Congress
2018	Nayeli Salvatori Bojalil (Note: Originally elected for the Social Encounter Party, Salvatori Bojalil switched to Morena on 3 February 2021.)	Social Encounter Party National Regeneration Movement	2018–2021	64th Congress
2021	Marco Humberto Aguilar Coronado	National Action Party (Mexico)	2021–2024	65th Congress
2024	María Fabiola Karina Pérez Popoca	National Regeneration Movement	2024–2027	66th Congress

== Presidential elections ==
Puebla's 10th district
Election	District won by	Party or coalition	%
2018	Andrés Manuel López Obrador	Juntos Haremos Historia	60.4850
2024	Claudia Sheinbaum Pardo	Sigamos Haciendo Historia	51.5864
