= Christian Hartinger =

New Zealand bioinorganic chemist known for his work in metal-based anticancer drugs

Christian Hartinger FRSNZ
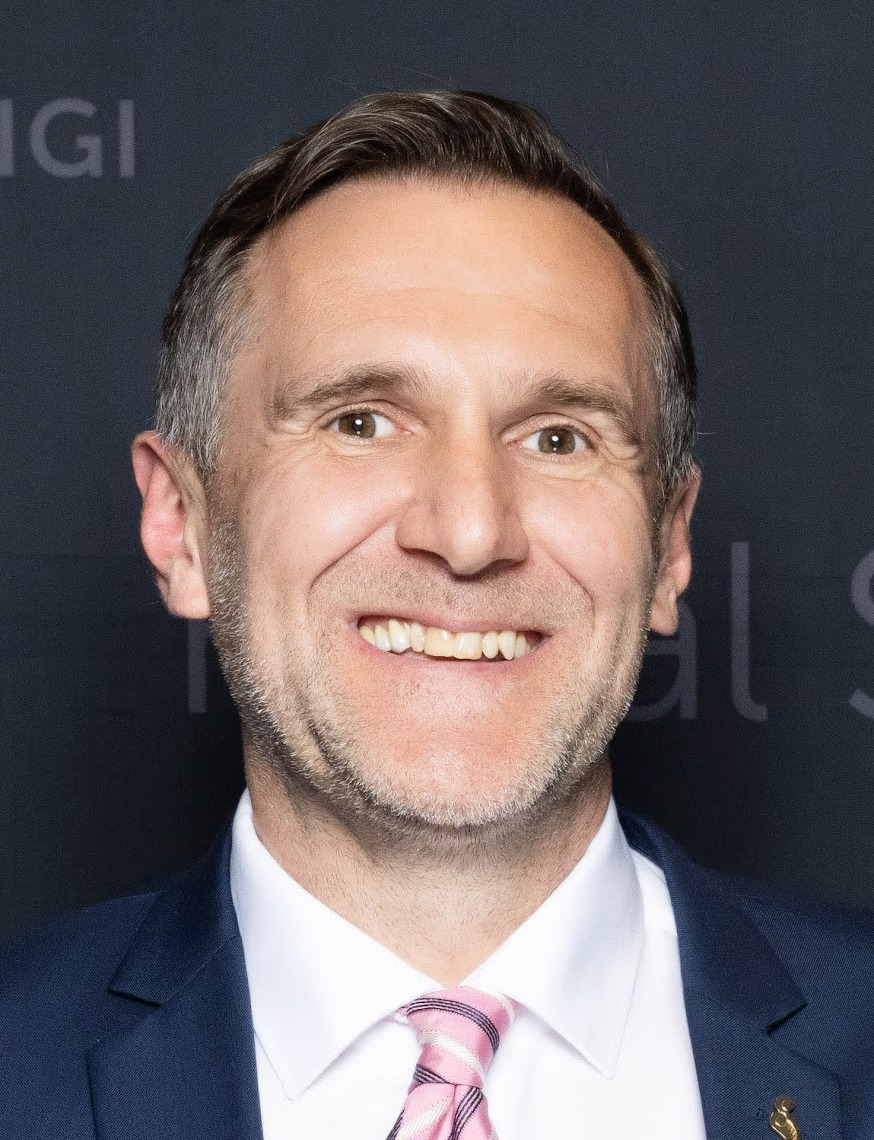
- Christian Hartinger in 2025
- Born: 1974 (age 51–52); Vienna, Austria
- Education: University of Vienna (MSc, 1999; PhD, 2001; Habilitation, 2009)
- Known for: Bioinorganic chemistry; Medicinal chemistry; Bioanalytical chemistry
- Awards: New Zealand Institute of Chemistry Maurice Wilkins Centre Prize
- Scientific career
- Fields: Chemistry
- Workplaces: University of Auckland
- Doctoral advisor: Bernhard Keppler
- Website: hartinger.auckland.ac.nz

Christian G. Hartinger FRSNZ (born 1974) is an Austrian-born New Zealand bioinorganic chemist known for his work in metal-based anticancer drugs. In 2022 he was elected a Fellow of the Royal Society Te Apārangi.

== Scientific career ==
Hartinger studied chemistry at the University of Vienna, earning his MSc in 1999 and his PhD in 2001 under Bernhard Keppler. He was an Erwin Schrödinger Fellow with Paul Dyson at the École Polytechnique Fédérale de Lausanne from 2006 to 2008 and obtained his habilitation at the University of Vienna in 2009. In 2011, Hartinger was appointed the position of associate professor at Waipapa Taumata Rau, where he currently serves and in 2015 was promoted to professor.

Hartinger's research interests are in bioinorganic chemistry, medicinal chemistry, and bioanalytical chemistry, where he uses an interdisciplinary approach in drug discovery. He is specially interested in the development of metal-centred anticancer agents, particularly ruthenium anticancer drugs, and using analytical methods to characterise their behaviour in the presence of biomolecules.

Hartinger has now published over 169 publications and has an h-index of 69.

In 2022 Hartinger was elected a Fellow of the Royal Society Te Apārangi. The society said his "innovative approaches have established new directions in metallodrug research, and his developed methodologies continue to have far-reaching impact in the community. His findings challenge paradigms about the reactivity of metal compounds towards biomolecules and thereby inform the design of novel biomaterials".

== Distinctions/honours ==
Year	Distinction/honour	Organisation
2005	Theodor Körner Prize	Theodor Körner Fund
2006	Erwin Schrödinger Fellowship	Austrian Science Fund
2009	Best Paper Award for the publication "Modifying the Structure of Dinuclear Ruthenium Complexes with Antitumor Activity"	Applied Organometallic Chemistry
2010	Innovative Teaching Award	Bank Austria
2010	Visiting Professor	Chimie ParisTech, France
2011	Carl Duisberg Memorial Prize	German Chemical Society
2013	Visiting Professor	University of Vienna
2014	Scientific Organizing Committee Co-chair	7th International Symposium on Bioorganometallic Chemistry
2016	Chair of the 8th Asian Biological Inorganic Chemistry Conference	8th Asian Biological Inorganic Chemistry (AsBIC) Conference
2016	SBIC Early Career Award 2016	Society of Biological Inorganic Chemistry
2016	New Zealand Institute of Chemistry Maurice Wilkins Centre Prize	Maurice Wilkins Centre
2017	Hood Fellowship (Cambridge, UK)	The University of Auckland Foundation
2017	Hill Tinsley Medal	New Zealand Association of Scientists
2025	Hector Medal	Royal Society of New Zealand

== Selected research outputs ==
- Meier, S. M.; Novak, M. S.; Kandioller, W.; Jakupec, M. A.; Roller, A.; Keppler, B. K.; Hartinger, C. G., Aqueous chemistry and antiproliferative activity of a pyrone-based phosphoramidate Ru(arene) anticancer agent. Dalton Trans, 2014, 43 (26), 9851–9855
- Meier, S. M.; Babak, M. V.; Keppler, B. K.; Hartinger, C. G., Efficiently detecting metallodrug-protein adducts: ion trap versus time-of-flight mass analyzers. ChemMedChem, 2014, 9 (7), 1351–1355
- Hartinger, C. G.; Groessl, M.; Meier, S. M.; Casini, A.; Dyson, P. J., Application of mass spectrometric techniques to delineate the modes-of-action of anticancer metallodrugs. Chem Soc Rev, 2013, 42 (14), 6186–6199
- Meier, S. M.; Novak, M.; Kandioller, W.; Jakupec, M. A.; Arion, V. B.; Metzler-Nolte, N.; Keppler, B. K.; Hartinger, C. G., Identification of the structural determinants for anticancer activity of a ruthenium arene peptide conjugate. Chem Eur J, 2013, 19 (28), 9297–9307
- Kandioller, W.; Balsano, E.; Meier, S. M.; Jungwirth, U.; Göschl S.; Roller, A.; Jakupec, M. A.; Berger, W.; Keppler, B. K.; Hartinger, C. G., Organometallic anticancer complexes of lapachol: metal centre-dependent formation of reactive oxygen species and correlation with cytotoxicity. Chem Commun, 2013, 49 (32), 3348–3350
- Meier, S. M.; Hanif, M.; Pichler, V.; Novak, M.; Jirkovsky, E.; Jakupec, M. A.; Davey, C. A.; Keppler, B. K.; Hartinger, C. G., Novel metal(II) arene 2-pyridinecarbothioamides: A rationale to orally active organometallic anticancer agents. Chem Sci, 2013, 4 (4), 1837–1846
- Babak, M. V.; Meier, S. M.; Legin, A. A.; Adib Razavi, M. S.; Roller, A.; Jakupec, M. A.; Keppler, B. K.; Hartinger, C. G., Am(m)ines make the difference: organoruthenium am(m)ine complexes and their chemistry in anticancer drug development. Chemistry, 2013, 19 (13), 4308–4318
- Kurzwernhart, A.; Kandioller, W.; Bächler S.; Bartel, C.; Martic, S.; Buczkowska, M.; Mühlgassner, G.; Jakupec, M. A.; Kraatz, H.; Berdnarski, P. J.; Arion, V. B.; Markos, D.; Keppler, B. K.; Hartinger, C. G., Structure-activity relationships of targeted Ru^{II}(η^{6}-p-cymene) anticancer complexes with flavonol-derived ligands. J Med Chem, 2012, 55 (23), 10512-10522
