= Juan Concha =

Juan Concha may refer to:

- Juan Carlos Concha Gutiérrez (1933–2025), Chilean surgeon and politician
- Juan Concha Urbina (1923–2010), Chilean politician
- Juan Pablo Jiménez Concha (born 1966), Mexican politician
