= Nordic Prize =

Nordic Prize could refer to:

- Swedish Academy's Nordic Prize
- Nordic Council's Literature Prize
- Nordic Council Music Prize
- Nordic Music Prize
- Nordic Council Film Prize
- Nordic Fernström Prize
- Philips Nordic Prize
