= Liliana Castillo Terreros =

Mexican politician

- Born: 28 September 1976 (age 49); Iztapalapa, Federal District, Mexico
- Occupation: Deputy
- Political party: PAN

Liliana Castillo Terreros (born 28 September 1976) is a Mexican politician affiliated with the PAN. She currently serves as Deputy of the LXII Legislature of the Mexican Congress representing Puebla. She took office on 16 July 2013 after Julio César Lorenzini left his seat.
