= Nay Salvatori =

Mexican politician

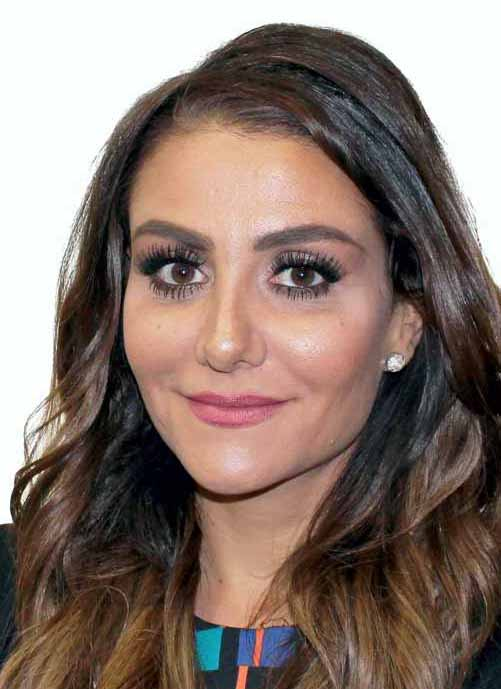

Federal deputy for Puebla's 10th district
- In office 29 August 2018 – 31 August 2021
- Preceded by: Miguel Ángel Huepa Pérez
- Succeeded by: Humberto Aguilar Coronado

Personal details
- Born: Nayeli Salvatori Bojalil; 26 August 1985 (age 40)
- Party: PES, Morena
- Occupation: Radio personality

Nayeli Salvatori Bojalil (born 26 August 1985) is a Mexican politician affiliated at different times with both the Social Encounter Party (PES) and the National Regeneration Movement (Morena). In the 2018 general election she was elected to the Chamber of Deputies to represent Puebla's 10th district during the 64th session of Congress.

== Life ==
=== Radio and TV ===
Salvatori, a graduate of the Universidad Madero with a degree in communications, gained fame in radio and television. In 2009, she appeared on the program Hazme reír y serás millonario. She also presented the news for TV Azteca Puebla between 2011 and 2014.

In January 2015, while she worked at Tribuna Comunicación-owned XHPBA-FM and hosted a program known as Ta'Carbón, she posed on air as an IMSS doctor to joke about a woman being beaten by her husband. That drew the ire of activists, including one who had been invited on her show. In addition, she was reported twice to the National Council to Prevent Discrimination (CONAPRED). The next month, she was fired after a confrontation with Ana Patricia Montero Rossano, the director of the station, whom she accused of organizing harassment against her. Salvatori would marry Ana's brother, Mario Montero Rosano, in May 2015. Three months after getting married, she resumed broadcasting her show online.

On 18 January 2018, Salvatori began a new program at Grupo ORO-owned XECD-AM 1170. However, one month later, she left the station in order to attend to her pregnancy, though rumors were already circulating about a potential run for office.

=== Run for federal deputy ===
Despite initially denying the candidacy, Salvatori secured the nomination for Puebla's 10th district under the Juntos Haremos Historia coalition banner, with her bid ultimately being assigned to the Social Encounter Party (PES). During the campaign, she gave birth to a baby boy.

As the race neared its end, Salvatori filed a complaint against Ana Cristina Ruiz Rangel, one of her opponents, for gender violence.

=== As a federal deputy ===
Upon winning election, Salvatori was assigned to four commissions, including a secretary post on the Radio and Television Commission and a slot on the bicameral commission that controls Canal del Congreso. In 2019, she also became an alternate councilor for the Social Encounter Party at the National Electoral Institute.

After becoming a deputy, Salvatori continued to make news for viral comments. In November 2018, on social media, she declared, "When marijuana is legalized, you're all invited to come to my house and smoke and listen to The Doors"; in a follow-up interview, she told media that she'd never smoked marijuana. She also called for a ban on bullfighting and wrote a bill to outlaw it at the federal level. In March 2019, Salvatori brought her son Mario onto the floor of the Chamber of Deputies and delivered a speech about verbal insults hurled toward mothers by other women, saying she was "fed up with being called a bad mother" for exercising her profession and posting photos of herself on social media.

On 3 February 2021 she announced that she was leaving the PES congressional benches to sit with Morena.
