= 1,3,5-Triaza-7-phosphaadamantane =

Names
- Preferred IUPAC name 1,3,5-Triaza-7-phosphaadamantane
- Other names: 1,3,5-Triaza-7-phosphatricyclo[3.3.1.1^{3, 7}]decane; PTA

Identifiers
CAS Number	53597-69-6
3D model (JSmol)	Interactive image
ChemSpider	126202
ECHA InfoCard	100.207.239
PubChem CID	143061
UNII	6W8JQP73M4
CompTox Dashboard (EPA)	DTXSID40201812
- InChI: InChI=1S/C6H12N3P/c1-7-2-9-3-8(1)5-10(4-7)6-9/h1-6H2 Key: FXXRPTKTLVHPAR-UHFFFAOYSA-N
- SMILES: C1N2CN3CN1CP(C2)C3

Properties
Chemical formula	C_{6}H_{12}N_{3}P
Molar mass	157.157 g·mol^{−1}
Appearance	Colorless solid or white powder
Melting point	260 °C (533 K)
Solubility in water	235 g/l
Solubility	Soluble in methanol, ethanol, DMSO, acetone, chloroform and dichloromethane, less soluble in heavier alcohols such as 2-propanol or 1-butanol and THF, insoluble in hydrocarbons.

Hazards
- GHS labelling
Pictograms	(GHS07: Exclamation mark)
Signal word	Warning
Hazard statements	H302, H315, H319, H335
Precautionary statements	P261, P264, P264+P265, P270, P271, P280, P301+P317, P302+P352, P304+P340, P305+P351+P338, P319, P321, P330, P332+P317, P337+P317, P362+P364, P403+P233, P405, P501

Related compounds
Related compounds	Hexamethylenetetramine
- Except where otherwise noted, data are given for materials in their standard state (at 25 °C [77 °F], 100 kPa). Infobox references

1,3,5-Triaza-7-phosphaadamantane (PTA) is a chemical compound with the formula C_{6}H_{12}N_{3}P, a product of the substitution of a nitrogen atom of hexamethylenetetramine with a phosphorus atom. It is soluble in water, methanol, trichloromethane, acetone, ethanol and DMSO, insoluble in hydrocarbon solvent. As a reagent in organic synthesis, it is used as a ligand for transition metal complexes and as a catalyst for Baylis–Hillman reactions.

== Preparation ==
Hexamethylenetetramine reacts with tetrakis(hydroxymethyl)phosphonium chloride, sodium hydroxide and formaldehyde in water to obtain the product.

== See also ==
- RAPTA, a class of ruthenium complexes with the PTA ligand
