= María del Carmen Parra Jiménez =

Mexican politician

- Born: 13 April 1962 (age 64); Puebla, Mexico
- Occupation: Politician
- Political party: PAN

Dolores María del Carmen Parra Jiménez (born 13 April 1962) is a Mexican politician from the National Action Party (PAN). In the 2006 general election she was elected to the Chamber of Deputies to represent Puebla's 10th district during the 60th session of Congress.
