= Rogelio Flores Mejía =

Mexican politician

- Born: 29 January 1969 (age 57); Puebla, Mexico
- Occupation: Politician
- Political party: PAN

Rogelio Alejandro Flores Mejía (born 29 January 1969) is a Mexican politician affiliated with the National Action Party (PAN). In the 2003 mid-terms he was elected to the Chamber of Deputies to represent Puebla's 10th district during the 59th session of Congress.
