= Hans G. Boman =

Swedish microbiologist (1924–2008)

- Born: 16 August 1924; Engelbrekt Parish, Stockholm, Sweden
- Died: 3 December 2008 (aged 84)
- Education: Stockholm University
- Scientific career
- Fields: Biology
- Workplaces: Uppsala University, Umeå University, Stockholm University
- Doctoral advisor: Arne Tiselius

Hans Gustaf Boman (1924-2008) was a Swedish microbiologist with a special focus on innate immunity. Boman was born on 16 August 1924 in Engelbrekt Parish, Stockholm, Sweden, and died on 3 December 2008. Boman's pioneering research on insect immunity formed the basis for the Nobel Prize in Physiology or Medicine that was awarded to Jules Hoffman in 2011.

== Biography ==
Hans G. Boman graduated from Uppsala University, where he obtained his PhD in biochemistry in 1958 with Professor Arne Tiselius. He completed his post-doctoral studies at the Rockefeller Institute in New York. During his stay in New York, he married Anita Boman, who then became his main research partner. They returned to Sweden and Uppsala University in 1960 where he established a research group at the Department of Biochemistry. In 1966 Boman was appointed professor of microbiology at Umeå University. Between 1966 and 1976 he built up the Department of Microbiology at Umeå University, where his research focused on mechanisms for bacterial antibiotic resistance. Boman combined physiological, molecular, biochemical and genetic methods in a way that was unique at that time. In 1976, Boman became professor of microbiology at Stockholm University where his work in moths identified the first antimicrobial peptides of animals in 1981. He later moved to the Microbiological and Tumor Biology Center at the Karolinska Institute in 1997. At the Karolinska Institute, he identified a disease that occurs in connection with antimicrobial peptides.

== Research ==
During his time in Umeå, Boman collaborated with Bertil Rasmusson at the Department of Genetics. In a famous back-and-forth exchange, Boman put forth unto Rasmusson: "'Do fruit flies ever get sick?' (Boman). 'Very rarely,' (Rasmuson). 'Then they must have an efficient immune response!' (Boman)." Their work asked how insects can survive infections without having a system of B cells and T cells, at the time thought to be essential for immune defence. They examined the immune system of fruit flies and could show that flies that were once infected with a non-lethal dose of the bacterium Pseudomonas survived a second higher dose while flies that received the same high dose for the first time died.

Boman continued to investigate the immune response of insects, focussing on the proteins induced by immune challenge. This posed technical challenges that required a larger insect capable of donating more hemolymph (insect blood). His eventual choice was the Cecropia silk moth (Hyalophora cecropia).

In 1981, Boman's group published the protein structure of the antimicrobial peptide cecropin, the first animalian antimicrobial peptide described. With techniques for cloning genes, Boman's group was able to continue studies on immune genes in Cecropia. At the same time, the field of innate immunity rapidly expanded, benefitting from the genetic tools available in Drosophila in the search to understand how insect immunity recognizes and signals following infection. From these initial studies, a number of insect antimicrobial peptides and other immune proteins were characterized, and these peptides have been used extensively as readouts of immune challenge. Owing to Boman's discovery, immune-inducible peptides were used to identify competent or deficient immune responses, ultimately leading to the Nobel Prize for Physiology or Medicine being awarded to Jules Hoffmann for his work on insect immune signalling.

== Awards and honors ==
Boman was awarded the Fernström Prize for outstanding work in medicine in 2000. The Nordic scientific community mourned his loss in 2008, both with a posthumous acknowledgement of his lifetime's achievements in 2009, and by hosting the "Hans G. Boman" symposium held by Stockholm University on the 10-year anniversary of his death. In 2015, a family of immune-inducible peptides in Drosophila was named the "Bomanins" in Boman's honour.
