= Kari Alitalo =

Finnish MD and a medical researcher

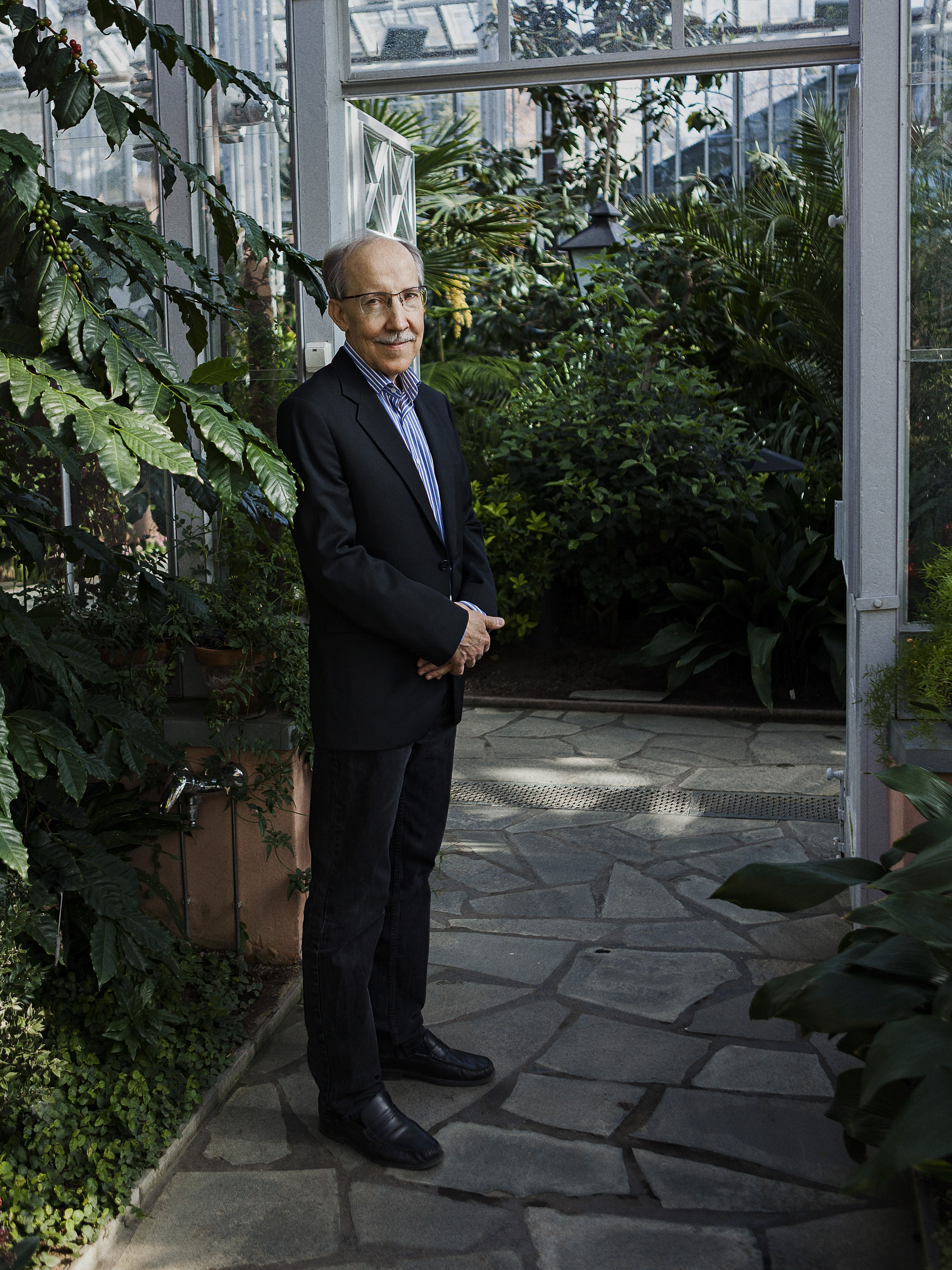
Kari K. Alitalo in 2014. (Jussi Puikkonen / KNAW)

Kari Kustaa Alitalo (born 21 May 1952 in Kuopio) is a Finnish MD and a medical researcher. He is a foreign associated member of the National Academy of Sciences of the US. He became famous for his discoveries of several receptor tyrosine kinases (RTKs) and the first growth factor capable of inducing lymphangiogenesis: vascular endothelial growth factor C (VEGF-C). In the years 1996–2007 he was Europe's second most cited author in the field of cell biology. Alitalo is currently serving as an Academy Professor for the Academy of Finland.

Alitalo received the Leopold Griffuel Prize in 2002 and the 2006 Louis-Jeantet Prize for Medicine. He also received the 2005 Eric Fernström Foundation's Nordic Prize and the 2009 In-Bev Baillet Latour Health Prize. In 2014, he received the Dr. A.H.Heineken Prize for Medicine.
