= Jens Christian Skou =

Danish chemist (1918–2018)

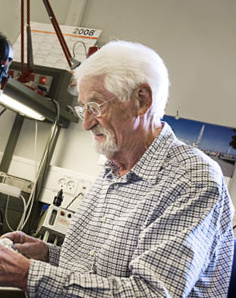
- Skou in 2008
- Born: 8 October 1918; Lemvig, Denmark
- Died: 28 May 2018 (aged 99); Risskov, Aarhus, Denmark
- Education: University of Copenhagen
- Known for: Na^{+},K^{+}-ATPase
- Awards: Nobel Prize in Chemistry (1997); Fernström Prize (1985)
- Scientific career
- Fields: Physiology, biophysics, biochemistry
- Workplaces: Aarhus University

Jens Christian Skou (Danish pronunciation: [ˈjens ˈkʰʁestjæn ˈskʌwˀ, - ˈkʰʁæs-]; 8 October 1918 – 28 May 2018) was a Danish biochemist and Nobel laureate.

== Early life ==
Skou was born in Lemvig, Denmark to a wealthy family. His father Magnus Martinus Skou was a timber and coal merchant. His mother Ane-Margrethe Skou took over the company after the death of his father. At the age of 15, Skou entered a boarding school in Haslev, Zealand. He graduated in medicine from the University of Copenhagen in 1944 and received his doctorate in 1954. He began working at the Aarhus University in 1947 and was appointed professor of biophysics in 1977. He retired from the Aarhus University in 1988, but kept offices at the Department of Physiology (today part of the Department of Biomedicine).

== Career ==
In 1997 he received the Nobel Prize in Chemistry (together with Paul D. Boyer and John E. Walker) for his discovery of Na^{+},K^{+}-ATPase, the first at Aarhus University.

Skou had taken a few years away from his clinical training in the early 1950s to study the action of local anaesthetics. He had discovered that a substance's anaesthetic action was related to its ability to dissolve in a layer of the lipid part of the plasma membrane, the anaesthetic molecules affected the opening of sodium channels which he assumed to be protein. This, he argued, would affect the movement of sodium ions and make nerve cells inexcitable, thus causing anaesthesia.

Skou thought that other types of membrane protein might also be affected by local anaesthetics dissolving in the lipid part of the membrane. He therefore had the idea of looking at an enzyme which was embedded in the membrane and finding out if its properties were affected by local anaesthetics. He looked at ATPase in crab nerves.

The enzyme was there, but its activity was very variable and he needed a highly active enzyme for his studies. Eventually he managed to discover that ATPase was most active when exposed to the right combination of sodium, potassium and magnesium ions. Only then did he realise that this enzyme might have something to do with the active movement of sodium and potassium across the plasma membrane. This idea had been postulated many years before, however, the mechanism was quite unknown.

Skou published his findings. However, in his paper he was wary of identifying the enzyme with the active ion movement, so he left out the term "sodium-potassium pump" from the title of his paper. Indeed, he seems to have realised the importance of his discovery only gradually, and he continued his studies on local anaesthetics.

In 1958 Skou went to a conference in Vienna to describe his work on cholinesterase. There he met Robert Post (born 1920), who had been studying the pumping of sodium and potassium in red blood cells. Post had recently discovered that three sodium ions were pumped out of the cell for every two potassium ions pumped in, and in his research he had made use of a substance called ouabain (or g-strophanthin) which had recently been shown to inhibit the pump).

Post had not read Skou's paper, but he was excited when Skou told him about his work with ATPase. Post asked whether the enzyme was inhibited by ouabain. At this stage Skou was unaware that ouabain inhibited the pump, but he immediately telephoned his lab and arranged for the experiment to be done. Ouabain did indeed inhibit the enzyme, thus establishing a link between the enzyme and the sodium-potassium pump.

Following the Nobel Prize, Skou gave several interviews recounting the story of his discoveries, and at age 94 was reported to still keep up with publications in his field. He died on 28 May 2018 in Aarhus, Denmark at the age of 99, less than five months shy of his 100th birthday.
