= Lorenzini =

Lorenzini is an Italian surname. Notable people with the surname include:

- Antonio Lorenzini (1655–1740), Italian painter and engraver, active in Bologna and in Florence
- Carlo Lorenzini (1826–1890), pen name C. Collodi, Florentine children's writer known for the fairy tale The Adventures of Pinocchio
- Carola Lorenzini (1889–1941), Argentine aviator
- Cedric Lorenzini, French bridge player
- Davide Lorenzini (born 1969), Italian diver
- Edmondo Lorenzini (1938–2020), Italian footballer
- Eldora Lorenzini (1910–1993), American painter
- John Lorenzini (born 1956), former Australian rules footballer
- Julio César Lorenzini (born 1977), Mexican politician and lawyer
- Kena Lorenzini (born 1959), Chilean photographer, writer, and activist
- Martín Lorenzini (born 1975), Argentine chess grandmaster
- Orlando Lorenzini (1890–1941), Italian general during World War II
- Pablo Lorenzini (1949–2025), Chilean politician
- Pietro Lorenzini (born 1989), Italian footballer
- Roberto Lorenzini (born 1966), Italian footballer and coach
- Stefano Lorenzini (fl. 1652–1678), Italian physician and noted ichthyologist
- Vance Lorenzini, American production designer of television commercials and music videos

== See also ==
- Ampullae of Lorenzini, special sensing organs, forming a network of jelly-filled canals in cartilaginous fishes
