= Salvador Escobedo Zoletto =

Mexican politician

- Born: 3 January 1957 (age 69); San Luis Potosí, San Luis Potosí, Mexico
- Occupation: Politician
- Political party: PAN

Neftalí Salvador Escobedo Zoletto (born 3 January 1957) is a Mexican politician from the National Action Party (PAN). In the 2000 general election he was elected to the Chamber of Deputies to represent Puebla's 10th district during the 58th session of Congress.
