= HighWire =

Internet hosting service

- Formation: 1995; 31 years ago
- Location: Princeton, New Jersey, USA; Belfast, Northern Ireland, UK; Brighton, England, UK
- President & CEO: Tim Bacci
- Founding Director: John Sack
- Website: www.highwirepress.com

HighWire is an internet hosting service in the United States specialising in academic and scholarly publications. HighWire-hosted publishers collectively make over 2 million articles available (out of 7.5 million articles) freely accessible.

== History ==
HighWire was founded by Stanford University Libraries in 1995. The Journal of Biological Chemistry (JBC) (1905) published by the American Society for Biochemistry and Molecular Biology, was the first to launch online on the HighWire platform.

In 2014, majority ownership of HighWire was purchased by the private equity firm Accel-KKR.

In 2017, it was announced that the entirety of the journals published by HighWire would be indexed in Meta.

In 2020, HighWire was acquired by MPS Limited.

== Reviews and awards ==
While HighWire is primarily a hosting facility, a 2007 study showed that its search engine outperformed PubMed in the identification of desired articles, and yielded a higher number of search results than when the same search was performed on PubMed. PubMed, however, was faster.

HighWire was the recipient of the 2003 Association for Learned and Professional Society Publishers (ALPSP) Award for "Service to Not-for-Profit Publishing", and was named one of the "Ten to Watch" organizations in the Scientific, Technical & Medical information space in 2014 by Outsell. Founding Director John Sack was awarded the Council of Science Editors (CSE) 2011 Award for Meritorious Achievement.

In 2018, HighWire won the Best Business Intelligence Reporting & Analytics Solution award for their Vizors analytics product at the SIIA CODiE Awards.

HighWire was named a 'Best Place to Work' by The Business Intelligence Group in May 2018.
