= San Jerónimo Tecuanipan =

- Municipality and town
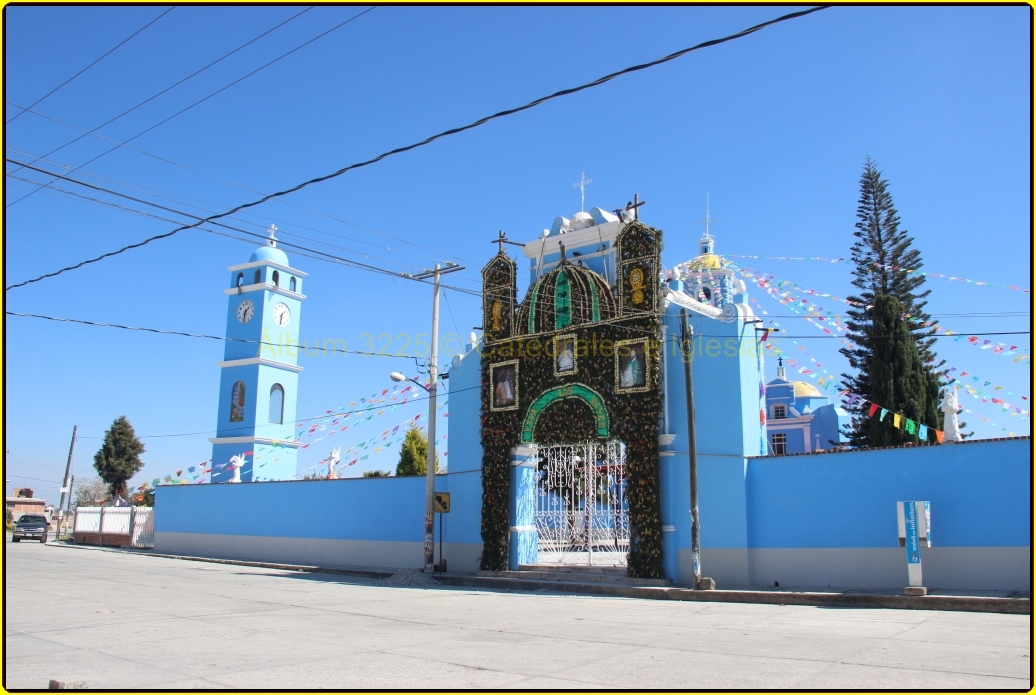

- Coat of arms

- Location within Puebla (state) Location within Mexico
- Coordinates: 19°01′N 98°24′W
- Country: Mexico
- State: Puebla

Population (2020)(municipality)
  - Total: 6,597
- Time zone: UTC-6 (Zona Centro)

San Jerónimo Tecuanipan is a town and municipality in the Mexican state of Puebla. In 2020, the municipality reported a total population of 6,597, an increase of 13.2% from 2010.
