= Humberto Aguilar Coronado =

Mexican politician

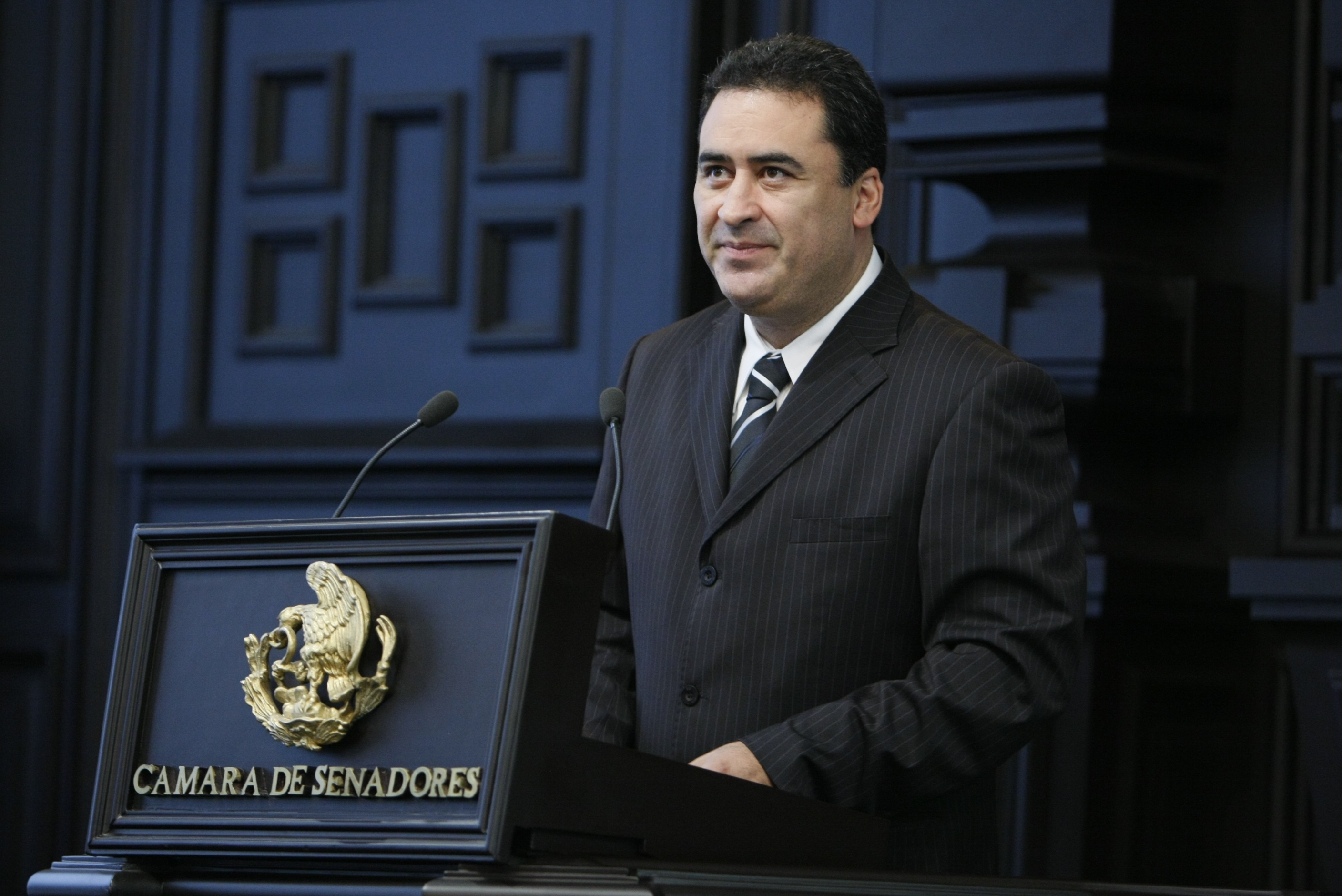

Personal details
- Born: 25 March 1963 (age 62) Poza Rica, Veracruz, Mexico
- Party: National Action Party
- Spouse: Patricia Fernández de Aguilar
- Children: 2
- Occupation: Politician

Marco Humberto Aguilar Coronado (born 25 March 1963) is a Mexican politician affiliated with the National Action Party (PAN).

In the 2006 general election he was elected to the Senate for the state of Puebla, where he served during the 60th and 61st sessions of Congress.

He has also served two terms in the Chamber of Deputies: from 1991 to 1994 (55th Congress), as a plurinominal deputy, and from 2021 to 2024 (65th Congress), for Puebla's 10th district.
