= Fernström Prize =

The Fernström Prize (Swedish: Fernströmpriset) is a series of annual awards for prominent Swedish and Nordic scientists in medicine. The prize money is donated by the Eric K. Fernström' Foundation. The prizes are managed by the medical faculty at Lund University.

There are two versions of the prize, both awarded annually – the main prize and a separate prize for particularly promising young researchers.

== Nordic Prize ==
The Nordic Fernström Prize (Nordiska Fernströmpriset) is awarded annually to an outstanding Nordic scientist in medicine. As of 2023, the prize money is 500,000 krona (approximately €50,000).

Recipients of the Nordic Fernström Prize

- 1979: Anders Lundberg, Göteborg
- 1979: Mogens Schou, Århus
- 1980: Örjan Ouchterlony, Göteborg
- 1980: Carl-Bertil Laurell, Malmö
- 1981: Kari Cantell, Helsingfors
- 1982: Egil Gjone, Oslo
- 1983: Georg Klein and Eva Klein, Stockholm
- 1984: Peter Reichard, Stockholm
- 1985: Jens Skou, Århus
- 1986: Christian Crone, Köpenhamn
- 1987: Torsten Almén, Malmö
- 1988: Peter Perlmann, Stockholm
- 1989: Torvad Laurent, Uppsala
- 1990: Sten Grillner, Stockholm
- 1991: Inge Edler, Lund
- 1992: Jerker Porath, Uppsala
- 1993: Carl-Henric Heldin and Bengt Westmark, Uppsala
- 1994: Anders Bill, Uppsala
- 1995: Per Andersen, Oslo
- 1996: Johan Stenflo, Malmö
- 1997: Arne Holmgren, Stockholm
- 1998: Staffan Normark, Stockholm
- 1999: Keld Danø, Köpenhamn
- 2000: Hans G. Boman, Stockholm
- 2001: Bo Hellman and Claes Hellerström, Uppsala
- 2002: Birger Blombäck and Margareta Blombäck, Stockholm
- 2003: Lennart Philipson, Stockholm
- 2004: Jan Holmgren, Göteborg
- 2005: Kari Alitalo, Helsingfors
- 2006: Leena Peltonen, Helsingfors
- 2007: Felix Mitelman, Lund
- 2008: Edvard Moser and May-Britt Moser, Trondheim
- 2009: Jan-Åke Gustafsson
- 2010: Antti Vaheri
- 2011: Anders Björklund
- 2012: Peter Arner
- 2013: Leif Groop
- 2014: Per Brandtzæg, Oslo
- 2015: Jens Juul Holst
- 2016: Jiří Bartek and Jiri Lukas
- 2017: Jonas Frisén, Karolinska institute.
- 2018: Maiken Nedergaard
- 2019: Søren Brunak
- 2020: no prize awarded
- 2021: Christer Betsholtz
- 2022: no prize awarded
- 2023: Harald Stenmark

== Swedish Prize ==
The Swedish Fernström Prize (Svenska Fernströmpriset) is awarded annually to six promising Swedish scientists in medicine. The prizes are distributed so that each winner works in one of the six medical faculties in Sweden:

- Gothenburg (University of Gothenburg)
- Linköping (Linköping University)
- Lund (Lund University)
- Stockholm (Karolinska Institutet)
- Umeå (Umeå University)
- Uppsala (Uppsala University)

== See also ==
- List of medicine awards
- List of prizes named after people
- Fernström Prize for Young Researcher – another prize from the same foundation to younger researcher who is successful and shows particular promise and who, as of 31 December of the year the prize relates to, has still not reached the age of 45.
