= NAMI-A =

Chemical compound

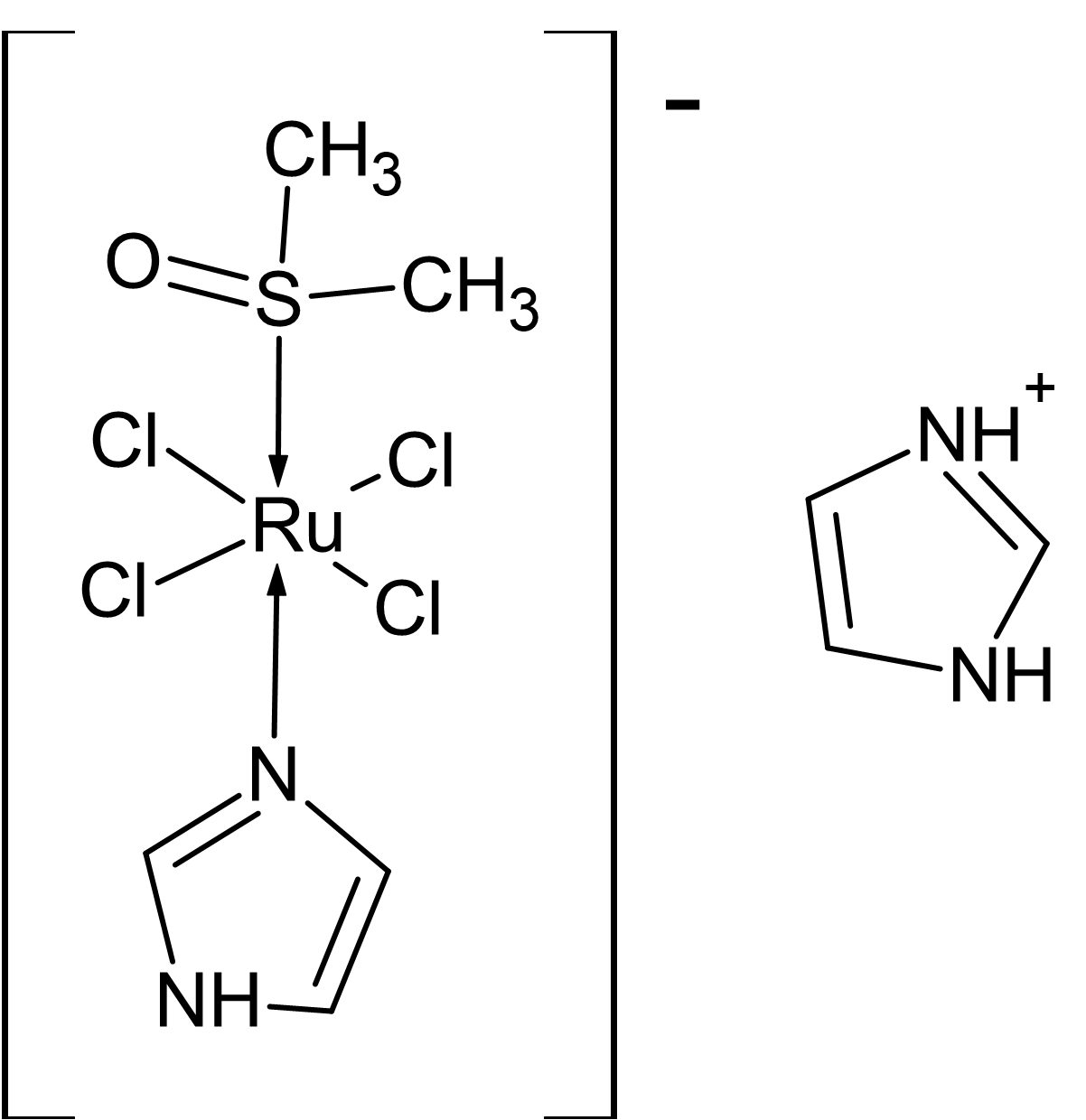

Clinical data
- Routes of administration: Intravenous
- ATC code: None

Identifiers
- IUPAC name: Imidazolium-trans-tetrachloro(dimethylsulfoxide)imidazoleruthenium(III)
- CAS Number: 201653-76-1
- UNII: 60487Z56XW

Chemical and physical data
- Formula: C_{8}H_{15}Cl_{4}N_{4}ORuS
- Molar mass: 458.17 g·mol^{−1}
- 3D model (JSmol): Interactive image
- SMILES: C1=CNC=[N+]1[Ru-3]([S+2]([O-])(C)C)(Cl)(Cl)(Cl)Cl.C2=C[N+H]=CN2

NAMI-A is the imidazolium salt of the coordination complex [RuCl_{4}(dmso)(C_{3}N_{2}H_{4})]^{−} where dmso is dimethylsulfoxide and C_{3}N_{2}H_{4} is imidazole. Together with KP1019 and BOLD-100, NAMI-A has been investigated as an anticancer agent.

== Reactions ==
NAMI-A is considered a pro-drug formulation that becomes active upon hydrolysis. At pH 7.4, a chloride is replaced by water giving a charge-neutral aquo complex. At lower pH, imidazole is cleaved and replaced with water.

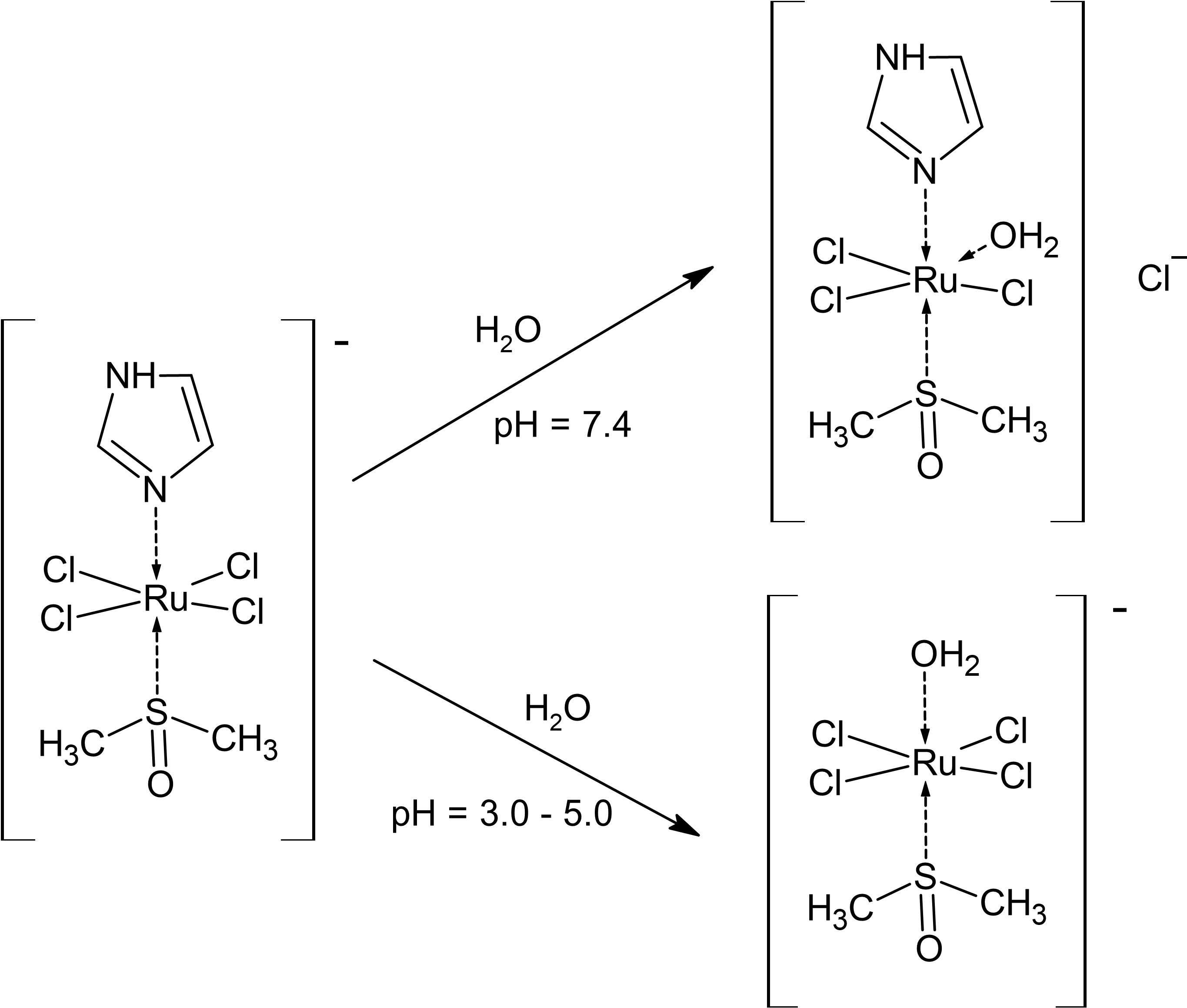
NAMI-A dissociates differently based on pH (Sava et al., 2001).

Unlike cisplatin, a platinum based drug, NAMI-A affects metastasis. Whereas platinum compounds can be highly cytotoxic, NAMI-A is much less so.

== Preclinical trials ==
Several preclinical trials were conducted in various model systems.

In 2002, a study published by Vacca et al. showed that endothelial cells incubated with NAMI-A, were not able to proliferate but that NAMI-A did not kill the cells that were already grown.

One trial was done to test the efficacy of NAMI-A in female grafted with MCa mammary carcinoma cells. It was determined that, NAMI-A showed very little toxicity yet managed to decrease the rate of metastasis. Perhaps most impressively is that, though NAMI-A is very sensitive to the environment, it is able to be effective over a range of conditions.

== Clinical trials ==
Clinical trials were conducted at the Netherlands Cancer Institute (NKI).

=== Phase I – monotherapy ===
Phase I trials were conducted on NAMI-A in patients with varying solid tumors 3 hrs a day, 5 days a week, for 3 weeks at varying doses. Drug was given intravenously with and without a port-a-cath. Several side effects were observed including:

- Mild hematologic toxicity - blood related toxicity
- Nausea
- Vomiting
- Diarrhea
- Stomatitis – inflammation of mouth and lips
- Fatigue
- Creatinine increase – common toxicity (CTC) grade 1 and 2 - High levels indicate kidney dysfunction
- Fever
- Sensitivity reactions to drug
- Phlebitis at injection site
- Blisters on hands and feet

Of the 24 patients in the study, 20 were evaluated for final results. At the end of the study, 19 of the 20 showed disease progression while 1 patient showed no progression.

Due to these results, Phase II trials, using NAMI-A as a solo drug, were not pursued.

=== Phase I and II – combination therapy with gemcitabine ===
Due to negative results of the stand-alone Phase I trial, and knowledge that NAMI-A slows down progression of metastasis, and not growth of the initial tumor, Phase I & II trials were done using gemcitabine, a nucleoside analog that has shown to be successful in treating lung cancer.

==== Phase I trial ====
Phase I trials were done to determine the optimal and maximum tolerated dose (MTD)of NAMI-A as well as determining the pharmacokinetics of NAMI-A and gemcitabine administered jointly. This was accomplished by a dose escalation study. The minimal dosage was 300 mg/m^{2} on a 28-day schedule and the max dosage was 600 mg/m^{2} administered on a 21-day schedule. 32 patients were enrolled in the study all of which had a form of non-small cell lung cancer (NSCLC), a median age of 57, most diagnosed as level III & IV of disease progression.

==== Phase II trial ====
Phase II trials were done to evaluate how NAMI-A in combination with gemcitabine impact cancer progression. 19 patients were added in addition to those from the phase I trial. Of the 27 patients evaluated for final results -15 showed anti-tumor activity, 10 showed stable disease progression for 6–10 weeks, and 1 patient exhibited a partial remission (PR) on the 300 mg/m^{2} for 21 days.

The patient who was observed to have a partial remission, occurred during the dose escalation phase I trial. In order to expand the trial, there needed to be at least one patient in the phase II trial that showed PR as the best response. Unfortunately, this did not occur. In addition, it was found that the results of NAMI-A in combination with gemcitabine, did not show improved results from studies done with gemcitabine alone.

Due to these results, clinical trials were terminated.

== Nomenclature ==
Contrary to what can be found in some papers, the nickname NAMI is not the acronym of “New Anticancer Metastasis Inhibitor”, but has a much more prosaic origin. It was created by a student as a short-form name of the chemical formula of the complex: “NA” comes from the symbol for sodium and “MI” from the word imidazole. The corresponding imidazolium salt was simply called NAMI-A to signify that it was an upgraded version of the prototype NAMI".
