= San Gregorio Atzompa =

- Municipality
- Location in Mexico San Gregorio Atzompa (Mexico)
- Coordinates: 19.0224°N 98.3445°W
- Country: Mexico
- State: Puebla

Government
  - Mayor: Jose Avelino Mario Merlo Zanella (2021-2024)
- Time zone: UTC-6 (Zona Centro)

San Gregorio Atzompa is a municipality in the Mexican state of Puebla.

== Towns ==
=== Chipilo de Francisco Javier Mina ===
Chipilo de Francisco Javier Mina, known as Chipilo, is a small city located 12 kilometers south of the city of Puebla, México. It is located 2150 meters above sea level. Its official name honors the memory of Francisco Javier Mina. The name for people originally from Chipilo is chipileño/chipileña. Most of the inhabitants of Chipilo speak chipileño, a variant of véneto.

== Demography ==
According to the results of the 2020 Population and Housing Census carried out by the Instituto Nacional de Estadística y Geografía. The total population of San Gregorio Atzompa amounts to 9,671 people; of which 48.4% are men and 51.6% are women.

The municipality includes a total of six towns in its territory. The main ones, considering their population of Censo de 2020:

| Town | Population 2020 | Degree of marginalization 2010 | Type of area 2010 | INEGI CODE: |
|---|---|---|---|---|
| Total | 9 671 | Low | N/A | 21125 |
| San Gregorio Atzompa | 5 066 | High | Urban | 211250001 |
| Chipilo de Francisco Javier Mina | 4 059 | Very low | Urban | 211250002 |
| San Miguel | 454 | High | Rural | 211250003 |
| La Venta | 1-13 | High | Rural | 211250004 |
| Guadalupe | 40-60 | Very low | Rural | 211250005 |
| La Laguna | 30-57 | Medium | Rural | 211250006 |

== Politics ==
List of Municipal Presidents

- (2005 - 2008): RITO JORGE MENDEZ GOMEZ
- (2008 - 2011): JOSE GUADALUPE TEAPILA RAMOS
- (2011 - 2014): MARCOS CUAHUEY MARTINEZ
- (2014 - 2018): HORACIO TLAHUEL ABRAJAN
- (2018 - 2021): José Avelino Mario Merlo Zanella
- (2021 - 2024): José Avelino Mario Merlo Zanella

== Recommendations ==
  - Municipios de Puebla
  - Chipilo
