= Juan Pablo Jiménez Concha =

Mexican politician

- Born: 2 March 1966 (age 60); Puebla, Mexico
- Occupation: Politician
- Political party: PRI

Juan Pablo Jiménez Concha (born 2 March 1966) is a Mexican politician from the Institutional Revolutionary Party (PRI). In the 2009 mid-terms he was elected to the Chamber of Deputies to represent Puebla's 10th district during the 61st session of Congress.
