= Anticancer Research =

- Discipline: Oncology
- Language: English
- Edited by: George J. Delinasios

Publication details
- History: 1981–present
- Publisher: International Institute of Anticancer Research (Greece)
- Frequency: Monthly
- Impact factor: 2.480 (2020)

Standard abbreviations
- ISO 4: Anticancer Res.

Indexing
- ISSN: 0250-7005 (print); 1791-7530 (web)
- OCLC no.: 07636918

Links
- Journal homepage

Anticancer Research is an independent international peer-reviewed medical journal published by the International Institute of Anticancer Research, addressing experimental and clinical topics in oncology. Issues are released monthly print and online (by Highwire Press), and an annual Index is also published. Anticancer Research was established in 1981 by John G. Delinassios.

According to the Journal Citation Reports, the journal had a 2020 impact factor of 2.480 and 25,656 total cites. The 2020 rejection rate was 68%.

According to Scimago, the journal belongs to the second quartile (Q2) in the "Medicine" category.

== Abstracting and indexing ==
Articles in Anticancer Research are abstracted and/or indexed by:

- BIOBASE
- Biological Abstracts
- CAM abstracts
- Cambridge Scientific Abstracts
- Current Contents (Life Sciences)
- EMBASE
- EMBiology
- GEOBASE
- Pubmed/Medline
- Science Citation Index
- Scopus
- Web of Science
