= Julio César Lorenzini =

Mexican lawyer

Julio César Lorenzini Rangel
- Born: 2 October 1977 (age 48)
- Occupations: Abogado, Empresario
- Title: Doctorado

Julio César Lorenzini Rangel (born 2 October 1977) is a Mexican lawyer In the 2012 general election he was elected to the Chamber of Deputies to represent Puebla's 10th district during the 62nd session of Congress.
