= Baramicin =

Antimicrobial peptide immune gene of fruit flies

Identifiers
- Organism: Drosophila melanogaster
- Symbol: Bara
- UniProt: C0HLZ9
Search for
- Structures: Swiss-model
- Domains: InterPro

Baramicin (Bara) is an antimicrobial peptide gene of the fruit fly Drosophila melanogaster. Baramicin is a prominent element of the fly immune response: of the most abundant immune peptides detected in the fly hemolymph, the BaraA gene is responsible for 9 of the 24 peptides first described for their high concentrations after systemic infection.

== Etymology ==
The name of the Baramicin gene was inspired by One Piece character "Buggy" and derives from the Japanese expression "Bara Bara", an onomatopoeia for things breaking apart, in reference to the Baramicin precursor breaking into multiple sub-peptides.

== Activity ==
The Baramicin A precursor protein can be broken into three distinct domains: the IM10-like, IM22, and IM24 domains. Five sub-peptides are produced by the BaraA precursor including one IM24 peptide, three IM10-like peptides, and one IM22 peptide.

=== Immune response ===
The Baramicin gene is part of the Toll pathway antifungal immune response. Flies lacking BaraA genetically are susceptible to infection by entomopathogenic fungi such as Beauveria bassiana and Metarhizium species, but also show some susceptibility to Enterococcus faecalis bacterial infection. The IM10-like peptides of BaraA are specifically proposed as antifungal peptides produced by the BaraA gene. The potential activity of the IM22 and IM24 peptides is unknown. Some element of the Baramicin protein may also regulate a behavioural response after infection, as flies lacking Baramicin display an erect wing phenotype after immune activation.

=== Nervous system ===
Antimicrobial peptides and neuropeptides share many common features. The distinction between which of these two roles, if either, is the primary function of any given peptide is often unclear. The Baramicin gene family of D. melanogaster includes the immune-induced BaraA and also two non-immune Baramicin genes BaraB and BaraC. The BaraB and BaraC genes are expressed in the nervous system, in neurons or glia respectively. Evolutionary study suggests the IM24 domain is the key element of the Baramicin precursor that is involved in Baramicin function in the nervous system. This finding suggests antimicrobial peptides and neuropeptides might accomplish immune or neural roles not only by dual action of a single peptide, but rather by different mechanisms of action of sub-peptides.

BaraA mutants also display a reduced recovery rate after the injection of neurotoxins, which is rescued somewhat by expressing BaraA in glial cells of the fly's nervous system. Together with the description of antifungal activity of IM10-like peptides, the BaraA gene therefore encodes both immune antimicrobials and some factor that promotes host resilience in the face of microbial toxins.
