= Metchnikowin =

Antimicrobial peptide

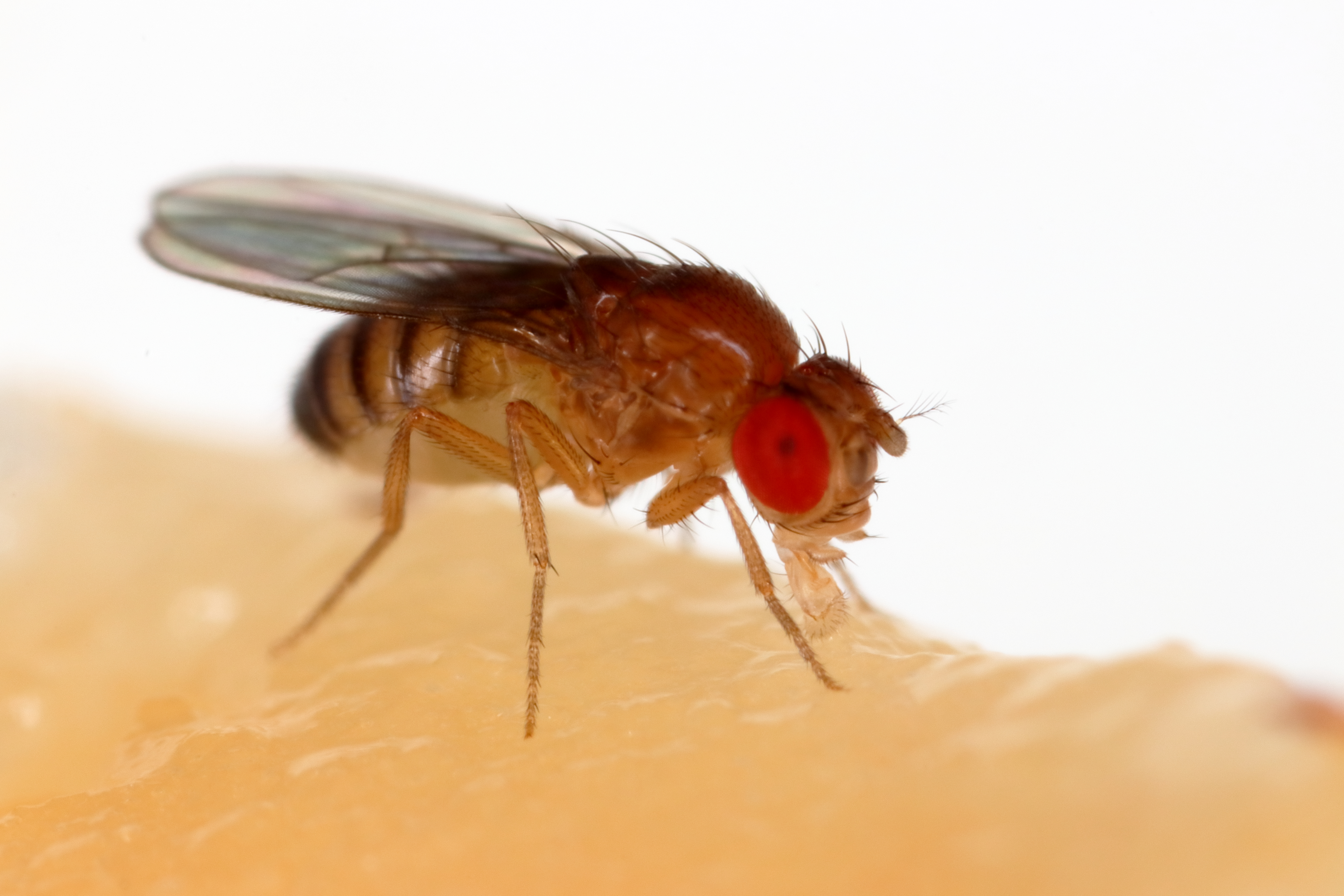
- The fruit fly, Drosophila melanogaster

Identifiers
- Symbol: Metchnikowin, Mtk
- InterPro: IPR012513

Metchnikowin is a 26-residue antimicrobial peptide of the fruit fly Drosophila melanogaster that displays both antibacterial and antifungal properties. This peptide is expressed strongly in the Drosophila fat body (an organ similar to the human liver), but is also expressed at surface epithelia in the trachea and gut. This is regulated by the NF-κB signalling pathways Toll and Imd. Metchnikowin is named after Russian immunologist Élie Metchnikoff, one of the founders of modern immunology.

== Structure and function ==
Metchnikowin has microbicidal activity against the gram-negative bacterium Escherichia coli and filamentous fungus Neurospora crassa at nanomolar concentrations. It is also one of the most abundant defence peptides in D. melanogaster following infection by the entomopathogenic fungus Beauveria bassiana. Proline-rich peptides such as metchnikowin can bind to microbe ribosomes, preventing protein translation.
