= KP1019 =

Chemical compound

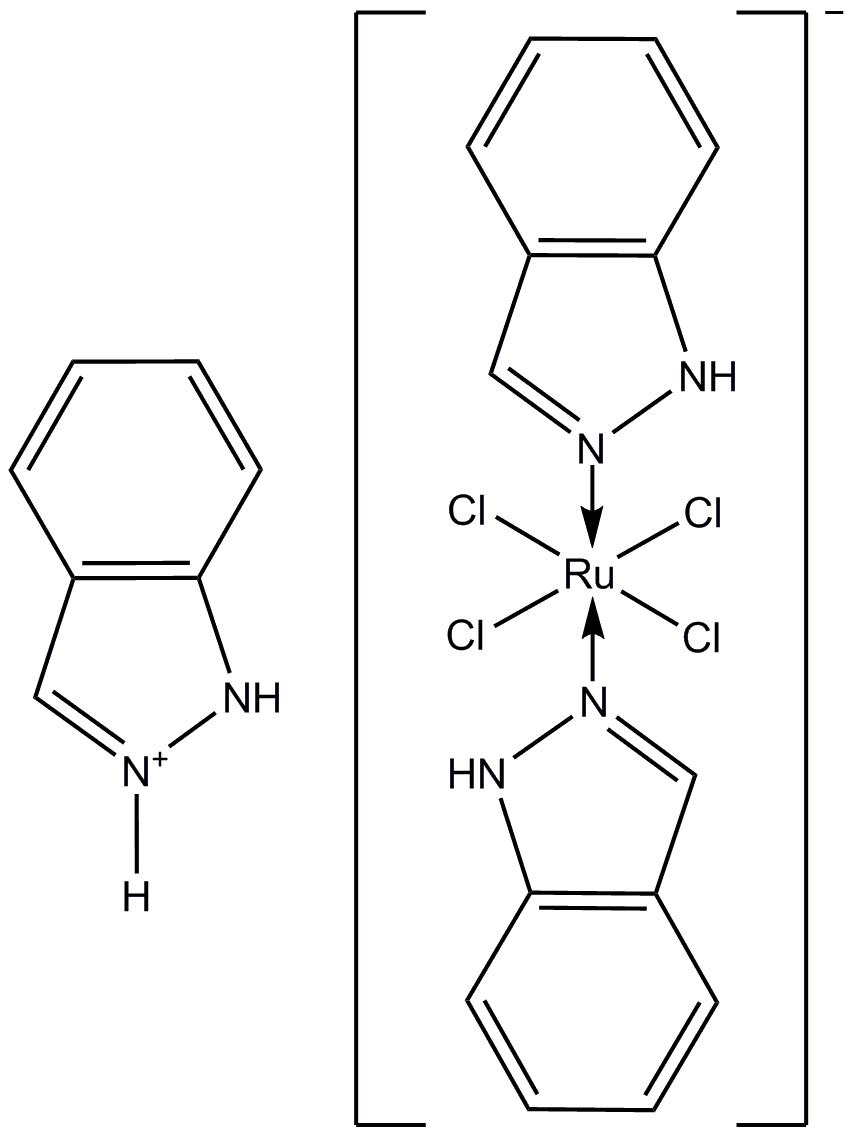
- KP1019 Chemical Structure

Clinical data
- Routes of administration: Intravenous (as a sodium salt, KP1339)

Identifiers
- IUPAC name: trans-[Tetrachlorobis(1H-indazole)ruthenate(III)]
- CAS Number: 124875-20-3
- PubChem CID: 86289346
- ChemSpider: 30786369
- UNII: DIO8FKP4J2
- ChEBI: CHEBI:77760

Chemical and physical data
- Formula: C_{21}H_{19}Cl_{4}N_{6}Ru
- Molar mass: 598.29 g·mol^{−1}
- 3D model (JSmol): Interactive image
- SMILES: c1[nH+][nH]c2ccccc12.Cl[Ru-3](Cl)(Cl)(Cl)([n+]1cc2ccccc2[nH]1)[n+]1cc2ccccc2[nH]1
- InChI: InChI=1S/3C7H6N2.4ClH.Ru/c3*1-2-4-7-6(3-1)5-8-9-7;;;;;/h3*1-5H,(H,8,9);4*1H;/q;;;;;;;+3/p-3; Key:PJXASRBEMZORRI-UHFFFAOYSA-K

KP1019, or indazole trans-[tetrachlorobis(1H-indazole)ruthenate(III)], is one of four ruthenium anti-cancer drugs to enter into phase I clinical trials, the others being BOLD-100, NAMI-A and TLD-1433. Research into ruthenium-based drugs has provided novel alternatives for platinum-based chemotherapeutics such as Cisplatin and its derivatives. KP1019 is useful for metastatic tumors and cis-platin resistant tumors. It exhibits potent cytotoxicity against primary tumors, particularly in colorectal cancer.

== Structure and properties ==
KP1019 has an octahedral structure with two trans N-donor indazole and four chloride ligands in the equatorial plane. It has a low solubility in water, which makes it difficult to transport in the bloodstream. The Ru-Cl bonds are labile and KP1019 readily exchanges its chloro ligands in the presence of water.

== KP1019 derivatives ==
Due to its low solubility in water, KP1019 is often prepared as its sodium salt, the basis for KP-1339 and BOLD-100. By replacing the indazole rings with imidazole rings the derivative KP418 is formed. KP418 also exhibits anti-cancer activity, however it has not completed Phase I clinical testing. KP418 exhibits slower cellular uptake and slower protein binding. Similar to KP418, replacement of one of the imidazole ligands with DMSO yields NAMI-A. NAMI-A is considered to be one of two leading ruthenium-based anti-cancer drugs, along with BOLD-100. Both have entered clinical trials.

== Synthesis ==
KP1019 is synthesized by refluxing RuCl_{3}-3H_{2}O with HCl and ethanol. The ethanol is removed and indazole is allowed to react with the solution at 70 °C. The resulting solid is collected by filtration and its purity is evaluate by UV-visible spectroscopy, elemental analysis, and determination of reduction potential.

== Mechanism of action ==
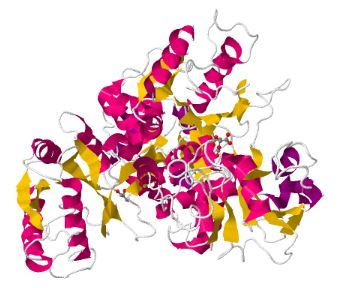
Human Transferrin (Tf) PDB: 2HAU

=== Activation by reduction ===
The active form of KP1019 has Ru in its 2+ state. The hypoxic environment of cancer cell tissue facilitates this reduction and the specific action on cancer cells over healthy cells. The intracellular reducing agent is unknown, but glutathione is a good candidate as it reduces promiscuously and has a reduction potential on par with the transition of Ru from 3+ to 2+. This mechanism of action is favorable in terms of efficacy as well. An increase in Ru (III) reduction potential positively correlates with the complex's antiproliferative activity.

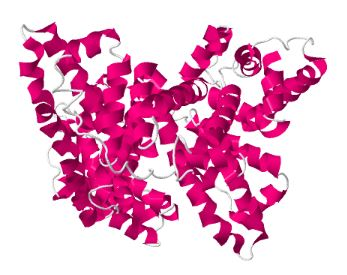
Human Serum Albumin (HSA) PDB: 1AO6

=== Reactivity with serum proteins ===
KP1019 binds transferrin (Tf), a 700 amino acid glycoprotein, in the pocket usually bound to 2 atoms of Fe^{3+}. The transferrin protein binds to the transferrin receptor and is taken into the cell by endocytosis. This protein and its receptors are overexpressed in cancer cells owing to their increased demand for iron, and it is believed that Tf transport is the reason ruthenium compounds accumulate in tumors. CD and ESI-MS studies have shown that one molecule of Tf binds two ruthenium complexes via. The intracellular release requires a significant increase in pH due to the high binding affinity. Citric acid or adenosine 5’-triphosphate, which are both present in vivo, are capable of liberating KP1019.

Human serum albumin, the most present protein in blood plasma, binds to KP1019 in a 1:4 protein:drug ratio. In plasma, it is almost exclusively bound to protein, up to 90%. It is possible that albumin serves to bind available Ru drugs until they are transported into the cell by Tf.

=== Interaction with DNA ===
Most metal-based anti-tumor compounds interact strongly with DNA. Binding assays of KP1019 with the four common nucleotide bases reveal a preference for guanosine 5’-monophosphate and adenosine 5’-monophosphate. KP1019 is able to untwist and bend DNA weakly. While Pt-based compounds also target purines, KP1019's DNA lesions may differ in quantity and strength. In tumor cells, the drug induces 15-fold lower interstrand DNA cross-linking efficiency than cisplatin. The interaction of KP1019 and its imidazole-containing analogue KP418 with DNA increases in the hypoxic environment that tumor cells are subject to. This correspondingly increased cytotoxicity as well.

== Preclinical cancer efficacy ==
KP1019 and KP1339 both induce apoptosis in colorectal tumor cell lines SW480 and HT29. This is induced predominantly by a loss of mitochondrial membrane potential in a high percentage of cells. DNA strand breaks are not believed to be the cause of the major damage. This is due to KP1019-induced death being independent of the cell's p53 status. Studies have shown oxidative stress to contribute towards KP1019-induced apoptosis. Furthermore, KP1019 has been shown to counteract tumor resistance to other metal-based drugs. KP1019 does not appear to be susceptible to the same cancer cell mechanism of acquiring drug resistance as other metal-based drugs, and remains potent in cell-lines known for their drug resistance. KP1019 has significant antineoplastic activity in chemically induced colorectal carcinoma in rats surpassing its in-vitro activity. The rat model of colorectal carcinoma is highly analogous to human colorectal carcinoma and presents a promising target for the drug. The yeast strain Saccharomyces cerevisiae serves as a cellular model for KP1019 and manifests induced DNA damage, cell cycle delay, and cell death.

== Phase I clinical trials ==
KP1019 was administered to patients twice weekly in doses ranging from 25 mg to 600 mg for three weeks. Patients had advanced solid tumors. Five out of six patients saw disease stabilization for up to 10 weeks. No serious side effects of KP1019 were reported.
