= BOLD-100 =

Experimental cancer drug

- BOLD-100 Chemical Structure

Clinical data
- Routes of administration: Intravenous

Identifiers
- IUPAC name: sodium trans-[Tetrachlorobis(1H-indazole)ruthenate(III)]
- CAS Number: 197723-00-5
- PubChem CID: 9806062
- DrugBank: 75535930
- ChemSpider: 7981822
- ChEBI: CHEBI:176975

Chemical and physical data
- 3D model (JSmol): Interactive image
- SMILES: N1c2ccccc2C=[N+]1[Ru-3]([N+]1=Cc2ccccc2N1)(Cl)(Cl)(Cl)Cl.[Na+]
- InChI: InChI=1S/2C7H6N2.4ClH.Na.Ru/c2*1-2-4-7-6(3-1)5-8-9-7;;;;;;/h2*1-5H,(H,8,9);4*1H;;/q;;;;;;+1;+4/p-4; Key:YGDDGJPSWMFECS-UHFFFAOYSA-J

BOLD-100, or sodium trans-[tetrachlorobis (1H-indazole)ruthenate(III)], is a ruthenium-based anti-cancer therapeutic in clinical development. As of February 2024, BOLD-100 was being tested in a Phase 1b/2a clinical trial in 117 patients with advanced gastrointestinal cancers in combination with the chemotherapy regimen FOLFOX. BOLD-100 is being developed by Bold Therapeutics Inc.

== Structure ==
BOLD-100 has an octahedral structure with two trans indazoles and four chloride ligands in the equatorial plane. The primary cation for BOLD-100 is sodium. BOLD-100's impurity profile contains trace quantities of cesium

== BOLD-100 derivatives ==
BOLD-100 is sodium trans-[tetrachlorobis (1H-indazole) ruthenate(III)] with cesium as an intermediate salt form. BOLD-100 was developed from KP1339 (also known as IT-139 or NKP-1339) which is also sodium trans-[tetrachlorobis (1H-indazole) ruthenate(III)], but has different manufacturing methods and purity profiles. The names are often used interchangeably.

The precursor to BOLD-100 is KP1019, which is the indazole salt equivalent. KP1019 previously entered Phase 1 clinical trials but development was halted due to low solubility in water, leading to the development of KP1339 and BOLD-100 which are readily soluble in water. KP1019 and KP1339 were invented by Dr. Keppler at the University of Vienna.

== Synthesis ==
Synthesis of BOLD-100 is accomplished by treating RuCl_{3} with an excess of 1H-indazole in a concentrated aqueous HCl solution. The resulting indazolium salt is treated with CsCl, and a salt exchange is performed that converts the cesium salt to the final sodium salt. The drug product is prepared as a lyophilized powder for parenteral administration.

== Mechanism of action ==
BOLD-100 kills cancer cells through multiple mechanisms, leading to cell death through apoptosis. BOLD-100 inhibits GRP78 and alters the unfolded protein response (UPR), while also inducing reactive oxygen species (ROS), leading to DNA damage. BOLD-100 can synergize with cytotoxic chemotherapies and targeted agents to improve cancer cell death. BOLD-100 also causes immunogenic cell death in colon cancer organoids.

== Clinical development ==
The precursor molecule to BOLD-100, KP1339 was tested in a Phase 1 monotherapy clinical trial in heavily pretreated patients with advanced cancers. In this dose escalation study, KP1339 was administered to 46 patients with doses ranging from 20 mg/m2 to 780 mg/m2. KP1339 was well tolerated, with the treatment-emergent adverse events occurring in >20% of patients being nausea, fatigue, vomiting, anaemia and dehydration. These adverse events were mainly grade 2 or lower. In the 38 efficacy-evaluable patients, nine patients achieved stable disease and 1 patient had a durable partial response. 625 mg/m2 was determined to be the recommended Phase 2 dose.

BOLD-100 is being tested in a Phase 1b/2a clinical trial in combination with the chemotherapy regimen FOLFOX (5-fluorouracil, leucovorin, and oxaliplatin) for the treatment of gastrointestinal cancers, including gastric, pancreatic, colon and bile duct cancer. This trial includes a dose escalation phase followed by a cohort expansion with 117 patients enrolled. Interim data presented at ASCO GI in January 2024 showed that BOLD-100 + FOLFOX was active and well-tolerated treatment in a heavily pre-treated Stage IV mCRC study population with 36 patients. Progression Free Survival, Overall Survival, and Objective Response Rate demonstrate significant clinical benefit and improvement over the currently available therapies, with minimal treatment emergent neuropathy or significant toxicities.
