= Torre Nvbola =

Skyscraper in Puebla, Mexico

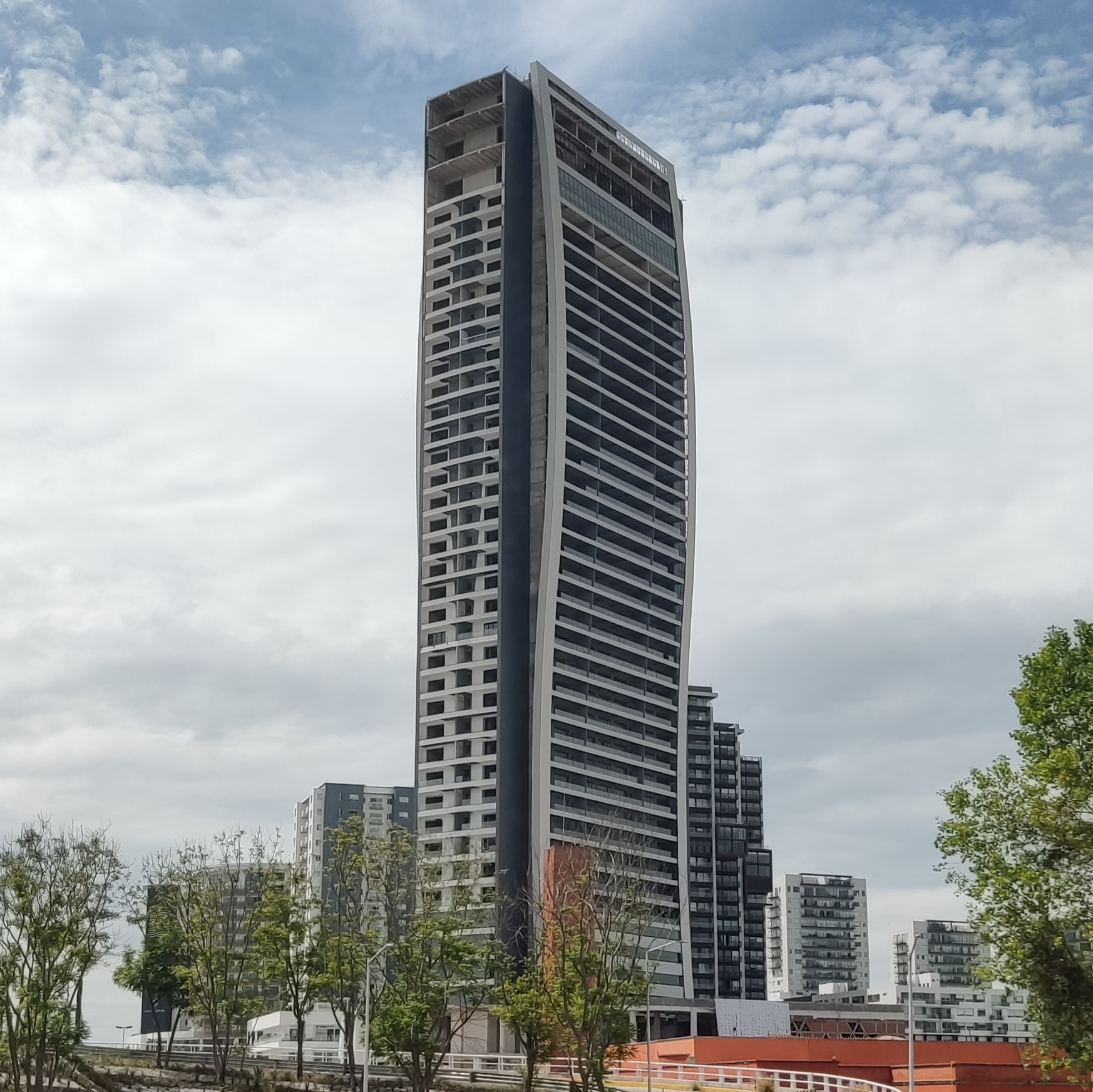
- Interactive map of the Torre Nvbola area

General information
- Status: On hold
- Type: Mixed-use: Office / Residential
- Architectural style: Neomodern
- Location: Puebla, Mexico, Blvd. América 303, II, 72830 Heroica Puebla de Zaragoza, Puebla
- Coordinates: 18.99618°N 98.28019°W
- Construction started: 2013
- Completed: 2023 (scheduled inauguration)

Height
- Roof: 198 m (650 ft)

Technical details
- Structural system: Reinforced concrete
- Floor count: 40 (+3 underground)

Design and construction
- Architect: Bosco Arquitectos
- Main contractor: Postensa

Website
- Torre Nvbola

Torre Nvbola is a mixed-use skyscraper on hold in the San Andrés Cholula district of Puebla, Mexico. Started in 2013 and originally scheduled for completion in 2016, the tower was topped out in 2022 and stands at 198 m (650 ft) tall with 40 floors.

== History ==
The tower is located in the San Andrés Cholula district of Puebla. The tower was proposed in 2012 and construction started in 2013 and was set to become the tallest building in Puebla and the tallest residential building in Mexico in three years and ten months. However, due to the disrupted continuity of the construction, the tower was surpassed by Torre Inxignia JV which was topped out in 2020.

=== Architecture ===
In the construction process, 80 concrete piles were used in the making of the foundation at a depth of more than 30 meters, grouped in a mega-cube measuring the size of three tennis courts, which gives approximately 9,400 cubic meters of concrete. This represented the equivalent of material enough to have an understructure of an eleven-story building. The entire concrete quantity was operated by a robotic pump that pours the concrete by climbing slab by slab. In an interview from 2013, Mexican architect Bosco Gutiérrez Cortina stated "Architecturally, Nvbola has something that I have never seen in any other building in Mexico, which is the generosity of the internal spaces. The apartments are 3.60 meters high. 360 is a magic number, it is 15 yards. Nvbola returns to 360, and that impressed me".

The tower houses a total of 174 apartment units and 12 social areas. Upon its completion, the building will have five divisions: commercial area, offices, apartments, amenities and a helipad. The apartments will have a ceiling height of 3.60 metres and can go up to 405 m^{2} (4,360 sq ft) as gross usable floor area individually. The last floors will display a swimming pool, a spa and a gym.

== See also ==
- List of tallest buildings in Mexico
- List of tallest buildings in Latin America
