= San Andrés Cholula =

- Municipal seat

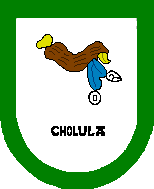
- Seal

- Location in Mexico
- Coordinates: 19°03′N 98°18′W
- Country: Mexico
- State: Puebla
- Founded: 500-200 BCE
- Municipal Status: 1861

Government
  - Municipal President: David Cuauli Jimenez

Area
  - Municipality: 61 km^{2} (24 sq mi)
- Elevation (of seat): 2,150 m (7,050 ft)

Population (2005) Municipality
  - Municipality: 80,118
  - Urban area: 35,206
- Time zone: UTC−06:00 (CST)

San Andrés Cholula is the municipal seat of San Andrés Cholula Municipality located in the Metropolitan area of Puebla, in the center west of the state of Puebla in the central highlands of Mexico, 122 km east of Mexico City and eight kilometres west of the city of Puebla. It is one of the two municipalities, along with San Pedro Cholula, that make up the modern city of Cholula or Cholula de Rivadavia. The city of Cholula has been divided into two parts since the pre Hispanic period, when the Toltecs-Chichimecas revolted, took over and pushed the formerly dominant Olmec-Xicallancas to the eastern side of the city. This side of the city is defined as the Great Pyramid of Cholula and east. The city has remained more or less divided since under different political organizations. However, the two halves share a common religious and social tradition which binds the city as a whole. San Andrés is known for being historically indigenous and still contains a larger indigenous population. It is also home to a number of colonial era churches decorated in Talavera tile and in a style called Indigenous or Folk Baroque. The best known example of this is the church in the Santa María Tonatzintla community.

San Andrés Cholula is a Pueblo Mágico listed with the name "Cholula (San Pedro y San Andrés)".

== Festivals ==
There are both citywide and local festivals which are celebrated in San Andrés, which are the fabric of social and religious life. Citywide festivals are held in conjunction with San Pedro Cholula. These festivals are sponsored by a complicated rotation of share duties, carried out by "mayordomos" whose time and money brings them prestige in the community. The citywide events include Carnival, the Vaniloquio, when the bells of the city's churches ring in coordination) Holy Week, La Bajada, when the image of the Virgin of the Remedies comes down the pyramid to visit the various neighborhoods and the most important, the feast day of the Virgin of the Remedies on 8 September. There are events related to the last all over the city, but the main focus is on the pyramid. Another annual event focused on the pyramid is the Quetzalcoatl Ritual, held each year on the spring equinox, with poetry, indigenous music and dance.

Most local festivals in San Andrés focus on the various patron saints of the neighborhoods and outlying communities. Each has a church dedicated to its patron saint and some have more than one. The night before such a feast day, the church is decorated with lamps and then fireworks are set off to announce the event. The next day, Las Mañanitas is sung to the image, there are a number of Masses and it is possible to receive a "visit" by the image of another saint from another neighborhood. During one of the Masses, a new mayordomo, or sponsor of the festival for the following year is chosen, an event which is usually attended by mayordomos from other neighborhoods. After this mass, food is offered to all in attendance. If the saint's day falls during the week, it is moved to the following Sunday. For major festivals, the parish church of San Andres is richly decorated in flowers, and there are sand paintings called carpets on the ground in Biblical designs. During the week long feast of Saint Andrew on 30 November, there is also folk ballet, musical performances and firework shows at night.

The outlying communities have a number of festivals as well. The Feria del Nopal (Nopal Cactus Fair) in San Bernardino Tlaxcalanzingo celebrates the main crop grown in the municipality. It occurs during the first week of June. The Feria del Queso (Cheese) Fair) is held in Santa Maria Tonantzintla and in held in honor of the Virgin of the Conception. There is an exposition and sale of local cheeses at the main plaza of the municipality on the first weekend of August. The neighborhoods' patron saints are celebrated on the following days: second Sunday in February in Santo Niño Macuila, 24 June in San Juan Aquiahuac, 29 June in San Pedro Colomoxco, 25 July in Santiago Xicotenco, 15 August in San Miguel Xochimihuacan and 8 December in San Andresito. Communities not within the city also have patron saints' day such as San Bernardino Tlaxcalancingo in July, San Luis Tehuiloyocan in August, San Antonio Cacalotepec in November, San Francisco Acatepec in October and San Rafael Comac in October.

== Bibliography ==
Cordero Vazquez, Donato (2000). Virgen de los Remedios en Cholula [Virgin of the Remedies in Cholula] (in Spanish). Puebla, Mexico: Media IV Impresion Visual. ISBN 978-970-94806-6-5.
