= Cholula massacre =

1519 Spanish attack by Cortés in Mexico

- Part of the Spanish conquest of the Aztec Empire
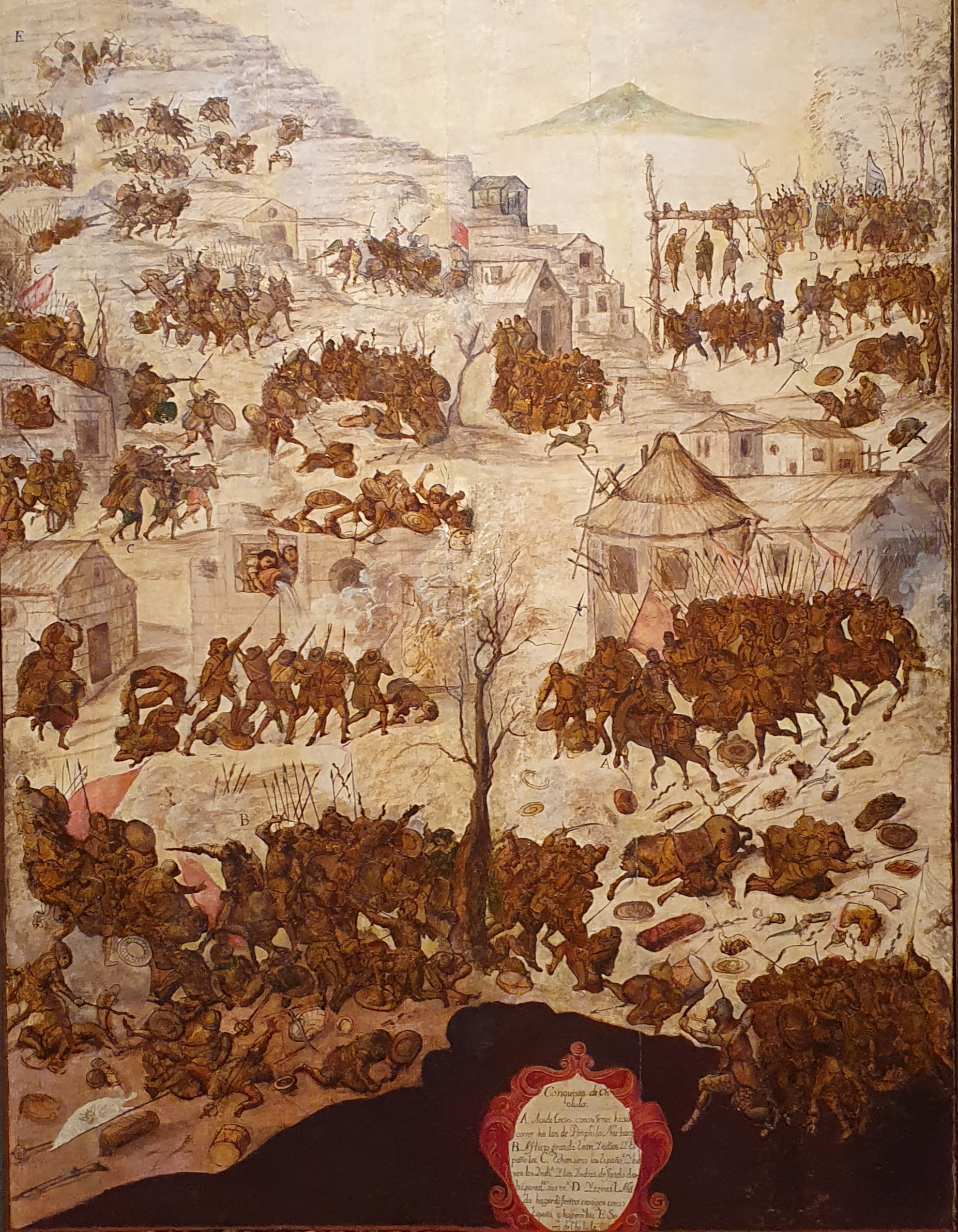
- 'La Conquista de Cholula' c. 1670–1730. Workshop of Los Gonzalez (1670–1730)
Date	18 October 1519
Location	Cholula Mexico
Result	Spanish victory

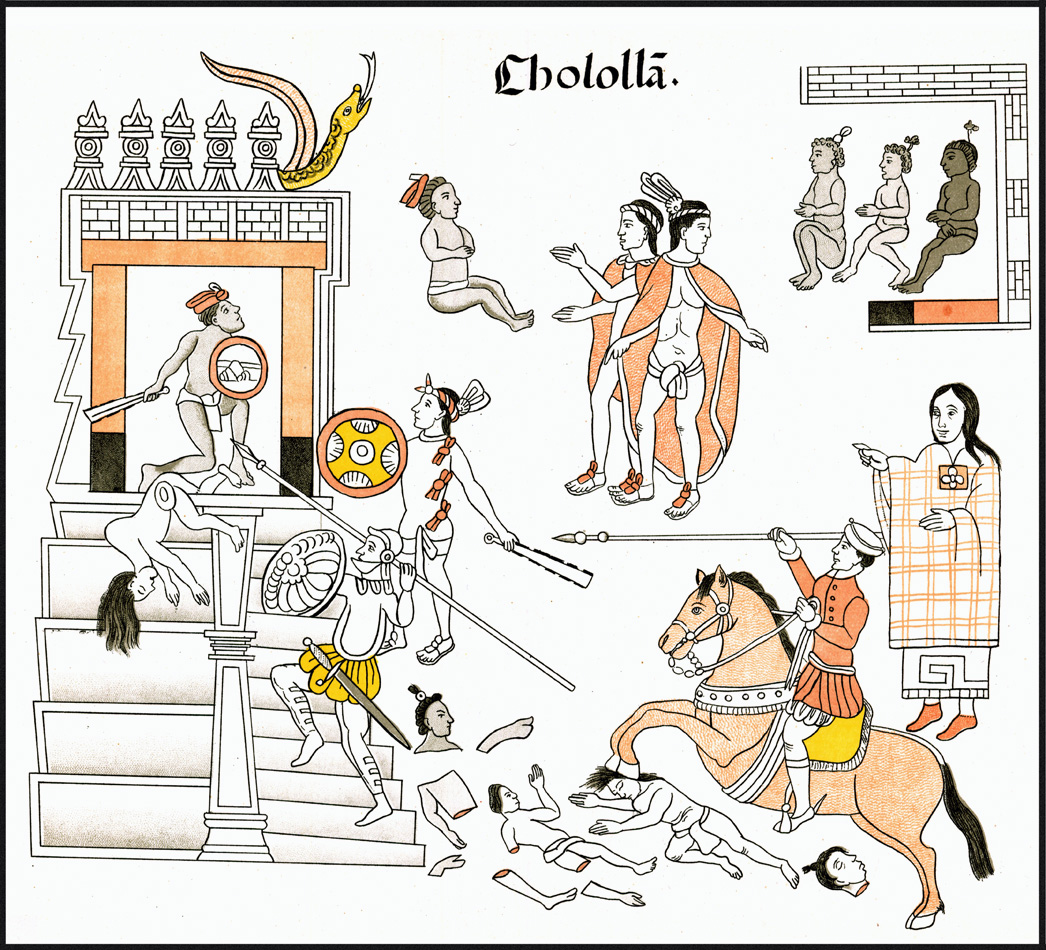
The massacre of Cholula. Lienzo de Tlaxcala

The massacre of Cholula was an attack carried out by the military forces of the Spanish conquistador Hernán Cortés on his way to the city of Mexico-Tenochtitlan in 1519. Francisco López de Gómara indicates that the massacre of Cholula began after Cortés captured and killed Cholulteca leaders, unleashing with this act the slaughter of 6,000 people in less than two hours. According to his letters of relationship, Cortés affirms that he made this decision as a preventive action before a possible ambush by 20,000 Mexica soldiers. However, the accounts collected by Bernardino de Sahagún contradict this version since it is narrated that only unarmed Cholultec civilians were killed.

== Massacre ==
There are contradictory reports about what happened at Cholula. Moctezuma had apparently decided to resist with force the advance of Cortés and his troops, and it seems that Moctezuma ordered the leaders of Cholula to try to stop the Spanish. Cholula had a very small army, because as a sacred city they put their confidence in their prestige and their gods. According to the chronicles of the Tlaxcalteca, the priests of Cholula expected to use the power of Quetzalcoatl, their primary god, against the invaders.

Cortés and his men entered Cholula without active resistance. However, they were not met by the city leaders and were not given food and drink on the third day. Cempoalans reported that fortifications were being constructed around the city and the Tlaxcalans were warning the Spaniards. Finally, La Malinche informed Cortés, after talking to the wife of one of the lords of Cholula, that the locals planned to murder the Spanish in their sleep. Although he did not know if the rumor was true or not, Cortés ordered a pre-emptive strike, urged by the Tlaxcalans, the enemies of the Cholulans. Cortés confronted the city leaders in the main temple alleging that they were planning to attack his men. They admitted that they had been ordered to resist by Moctezuma, but they claimed they had not followed his orders. Regardless, on command, the Spaniards seized and killed many of the local nobles to serve as a lesson.

They captured the Cholulan leaders Tlaquiach and Tlalchiac and then ordered the city to be set on fire. The troops started in the palace of Xacayatzin, and then on to Chialinco and Yetzcoloc. In letters to his King, Cortés claimed that in three hours time his troops (helped by the Tlaxcalans) killed 3,000 people and had burned the city. Another witness, Vázquez de Tapia, claimed the death toll was as high as 30,000. However, since the women and children, and many men, had already fled the city, it is unlikely that so many were killed.

The Azteca and Tlaxcalteca histories of the events leading up to the massacre vary; the Tlaxcalteca claimed that their ambassador Patlahuatzin was sent to Cholula and had been tortured by the Cholula. Thus, Cortés was avenging him by attacking Cholula.(Historia de Tlaxcala, por Diego Muñoz Camargo, lib. II cap. V. 1550). The Azteca version put the blame on the Tlaxcalteca, claiming that they resented Cortés going to Cholula instead of Huexotzingo.

The massacre had a chilling effect on the other city states and groups affiliated with the Aztecs, as well as the Aztecs themselves. Tales of the massacre convinced the other cities in the Aztec Empire to entertain seriously Cortés' proposals rather than risk the same fate.

Cortés then sent emissaries to Moctezuma with the message that the people of Cholula had treated him with trickery and had therefore been punished.

In one of his responses to Cortés, Moctezuma blamed the commanders of the local Aztec garrison for the resistance in Cholula, and recognizing that his long-standing attempts to dissuade Cortés from coming to Tenochtitlan with gifts of gold and silver had failed, Moctezuma finally invited the conquistadors to visit his capital city, according to Spanish sources, after feeling as though nothing else could be done.
