= Municipalities of Morelos =

List of municipalities of Mexican state

Map of Mexico with Morelos highlighted

Municipalities of Morelos in 2010

Morelos is a state in central Mexico that is currently divided into 36 municipalities. According to the 2020 INEGI census, it is the twenty-third most populated state with 1,971,520 inhabitants and the third smallest by land area spanning 4,878.9 square kilometres (1,883.8 sq mi).

Municipalities in Morelos are administratively autonomous of the state according to the 115th article of the 1917 Constitution of Mexico. Every three years, citizens elect a municipal president (Spanish: presidente municipal) by a plurality voting system who heads a concurrently elected municipal council (ayuntamiento) responsible for providing public services for their constituents. The municipal council consists of a variable number of trustees and councillors (regidores y síndicos). Municipalities are responsible for public services (such as water and sewerage), street lighting, public safety, traffic, and the maintenance of public parks, gardens and cemeteries. They may also assist the state and federal governments in education, emergency fire and medical services, environmental protection and maintenance of monuments and historical landmarks. Since 1984, they have had the power to collect property taxes and user fees, although more funds are obtained from the state and federal governments than from their own income.

The largest municipality by population is Cuernavaca, with 378,476 residents (19.19% of the state population), while the smallest is Tetecala, with 7,617 residents. The largest municipality by land area is Tlaquiltenango, which spans 543.90 km^{2} (210.00 sq mi), and the smallest is Hueyapan, with 19.20 km^{2} (7.41 sq mi). The creation of the four newest municipalities (Coatetelco, Xoxocotla, Hueyapan and Tetelcingo) was approved on November 9, 2017, by the state legislature and became effective on January 1, 2019. However, due to objections by authorities in Cuautla, it was decided on July 26, 2018, that Tetelcingo would not be created.

== Municipalities ==
Largest municipalities in Morelos by population

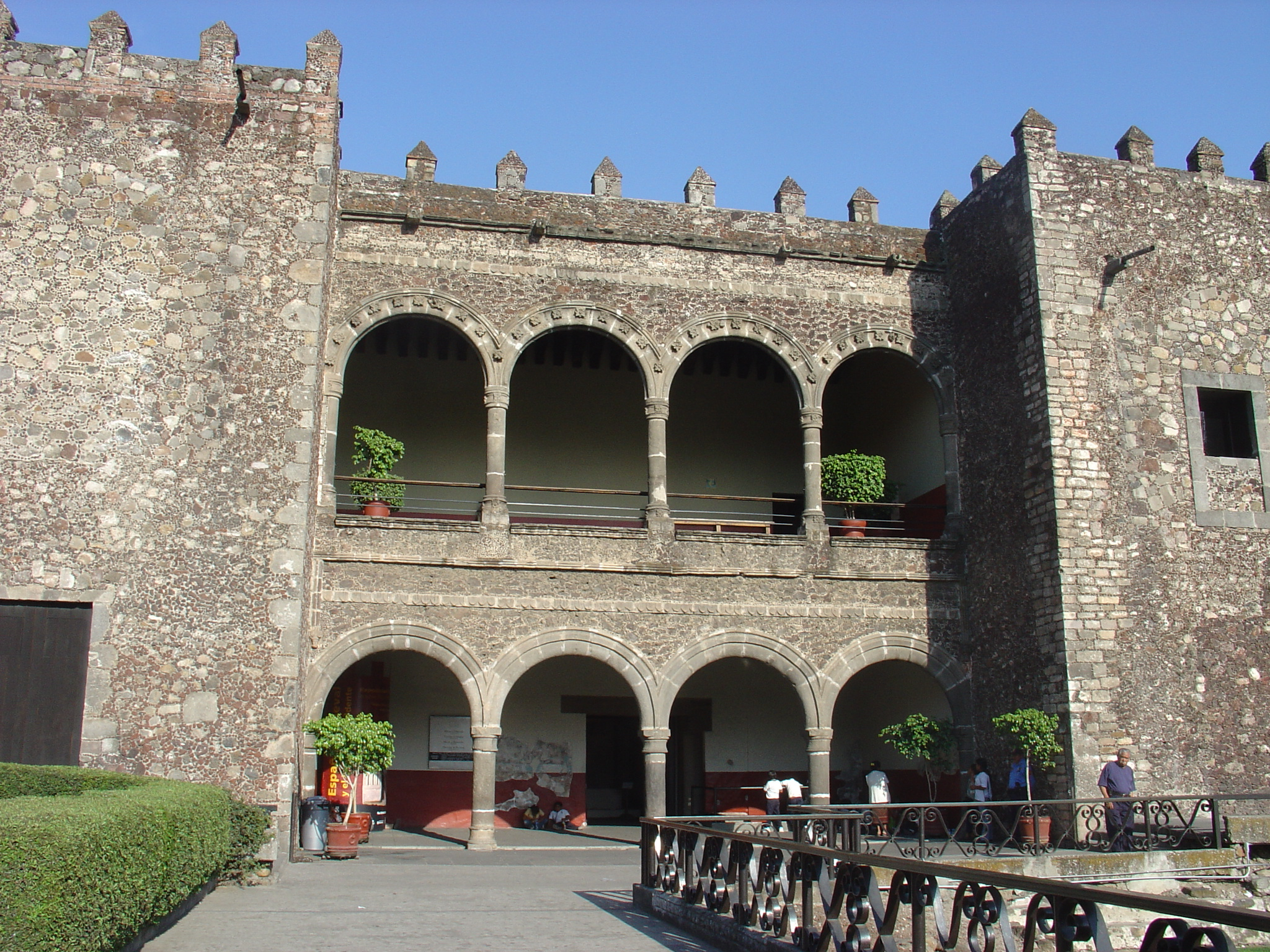
Cuernavaca, the state capital and most populous municipality in Morelos

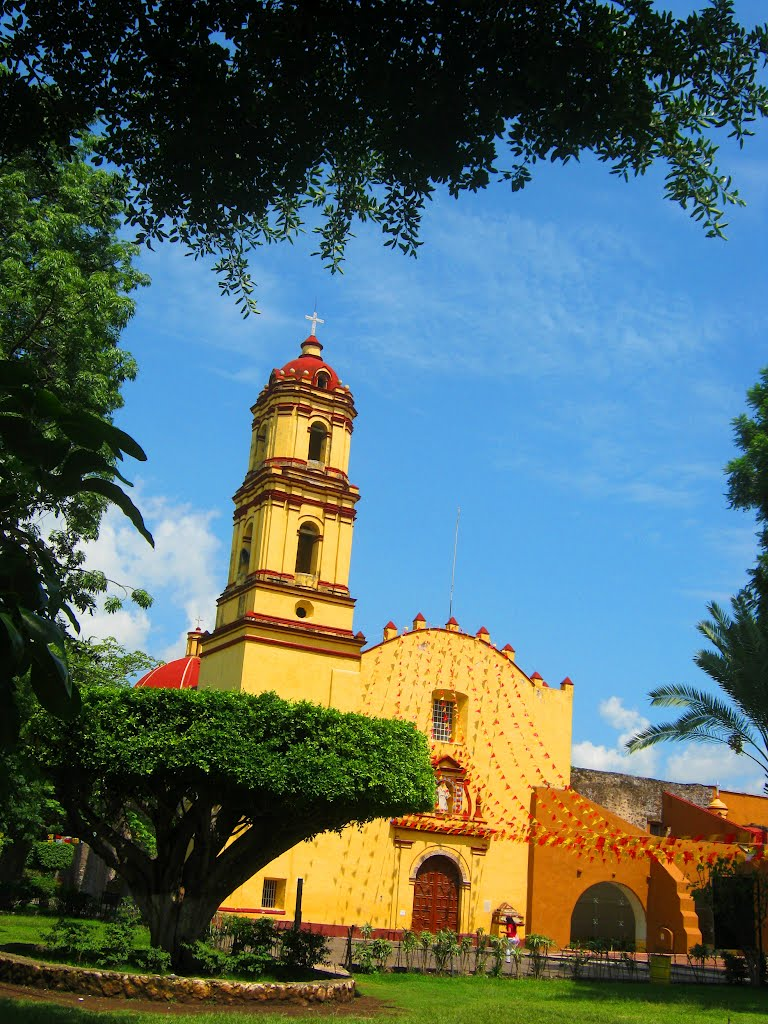
Jiutepec, second largest municipality by population in Morelos

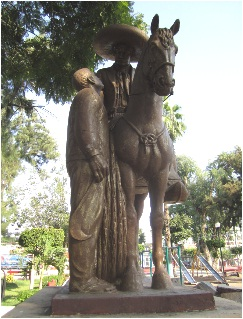
Cuautla, third most populous municipality in Morelos

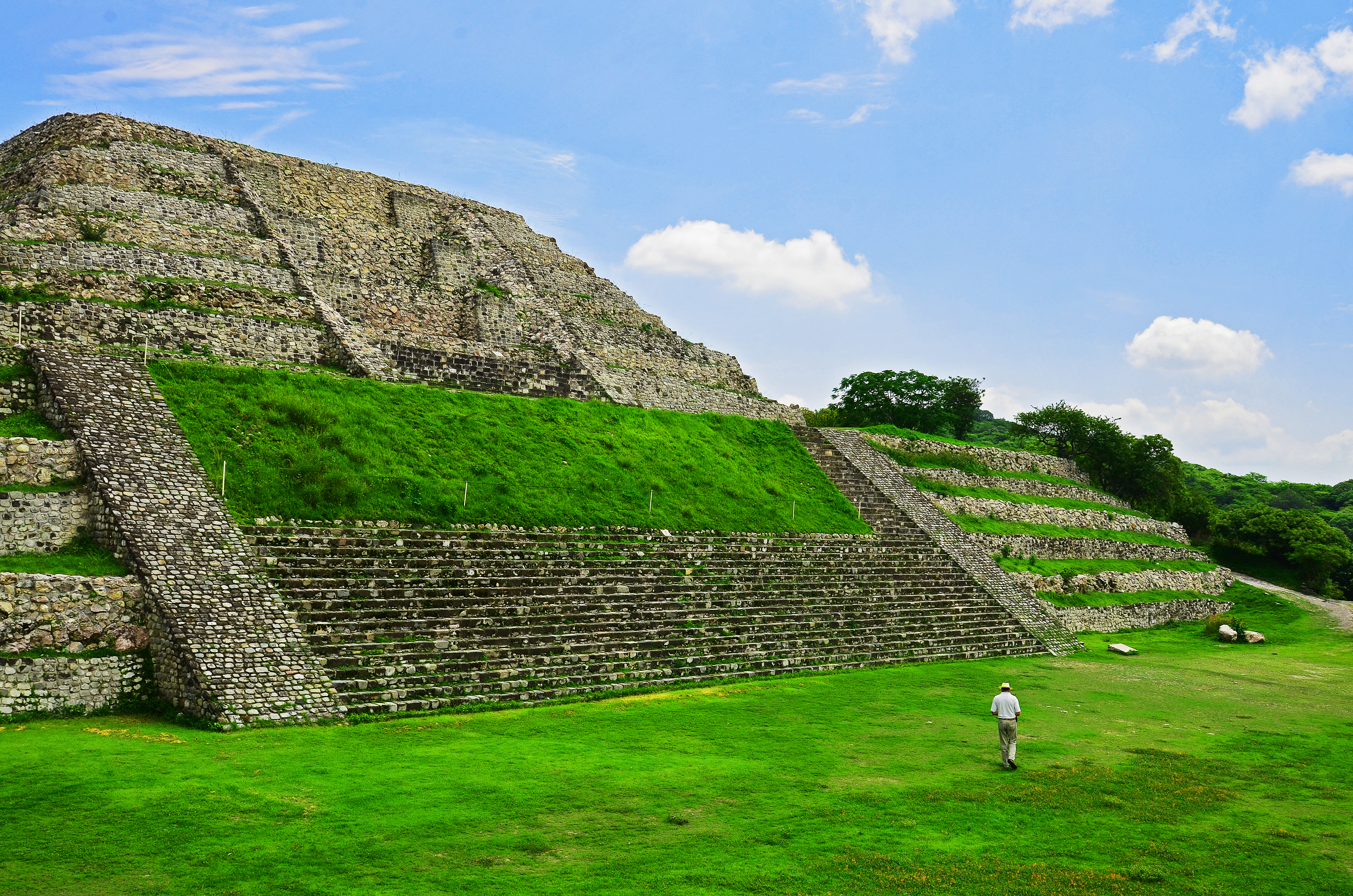
Temixco, fourth largest municipality by population in Morelos

† State capital

Municipalities of Morelos
Name	Municipal seat	Population (2020)	Population (2010)	Change	Land area		Population density (2020)	Incorporation date (Note: For dates where only the year is mentioned, the actual creation date is unknown and the earliest year in which the municipality is referred to is listed.)
Name	Municipal seat	Population (2020)	Population (2010)	Change	km^{2}	sq mi	Population density (2020)	Incorporation date
Amacuzac	Amacuzac	17,598	17,021	+3.4%	117.2	45.3	150.2/km^{2} (388.9/sq mi)	May 13, 1868
Atlatlahucan	Atlatlahucan	25,232	18,895	+33.5%	79.4	30.7	317.8/km^{2} (823.1/sq mi)	December 18, 1932
Axochiapan	Axochiapan	39,174	33,695	+16.3%	141.5	54.6	276.8/km^{2} (717.0/sq mi)	November 12, 1898
Ayala (Note: Ayala was originally incorporated as San José Mapaxtlán, changing its name on December 5, 1882.)	Ciudad Ayala	89,834	78,866	+13.9%	368.3	142.2	243.9/km^{2} (631.7/sq mi)	May 13, 1868
Coatetelco (Note: There is no 2010 census population figure as Coatetelco was created in 2019 out of Miacatlán.)	Coatetelco	11,347	—	—	51.6	19.9	219.9/km^{2} (569.5/sq mi)	January 1, 2019
Coatlán del Río	Coatlán del Río	10,520	9,471	+11.1%	83.4	32.2	126.1/km^{2} (326.7/sq mi)	July 31, 1861
Cuautla	Cuautla	187,118	175,207	+6.8%	121.9	47.1	1,535.0/km^{2} (3,975.7/sq mi)	August 6, 1824
Cuernavaca	Cuernavaca†	378,476	365,168	+3.6%	199.7	77.1	1,895.2/km^{2} (4,908.6/sq mi)	August 6, 1824
Emiliano Zapata	Emiliano Zapata	107,053	83,485	+28.2%	68.3	26.4	1,567.4/km^{2} (4,059.5/sq mi)	December 18, 1932
Hueyapan (Note: There is no 2010 census data as Hueyapan was created in 2019 by the partition of Tetela del Volcán.)	Hueyapan	7,855	—	—	19.2	7.4	409.1/km^{2} (1,059.6/sq mi)	January 1, 2019
Huitzilac	Huitzilac	24,515	17,340	+41.4%	189.1	73.0	129.6/km^{2} (335.8/sq mi)	August 29, 1921
Jantetelco	Jantetelco	18,402	15,646	+17.6%	102.3	39.5	179.9/km^{2} (465.9/sq mi)	1826
Jiutepec	Jiutepec	215,357	196,953	+9.3%	55.9	21.6	3,852.5/km^{2} (9,978.0/sq mi)	1826
Jojutla	Jojutla	57,682	55,115	+4.7%	149.0	57.5	387.1/km^{2} (1,002.7/sq mi)	March 29, 1847
Jonacatepec	Jonacatepec de Valle	16,694	14,604	+14.3%	90.3	34.9	184.9/km^{2} (478.8/sq mi)	January 29, 1825
Mazatepec	Mazatepec	9,653	9,456	+2.1%	57.9	22.4	166.7/km^{2} (431.8/sq mi)	December 16, 1848
Miacatlán (Note: The decline in population can, in part, be attributed to the partition of the municipality in 2019 for the creation of Coatetelco.)	Miacatlán	15,802	24,990	−36.8%	162.6	62.8	97.2/km^{2} (251.7/sq mi)	1826
Ocuituco	Ocuituco	19,219	16,858	+14.0%	86.5	33.4	222.2/km^{2} (575.5/sq mi)	1826
Puente de Ixtla (Note: The decline in population can, in part, be attributed to the partition of the municipality in 2019 for the creation of Xoxocotla.)	Puente de Ixtla	40,018	61,585	−35.0%	237.2	91.6	168.7/km^{2} (437.0/sq mi)	1826
Temixco	Temixco	122,263	108,126	+13.1%	102.8	39.7	1,189.3/km^{2} (3,080.3/sq mi)	March 5, 1933
Temoac	Temoac	16,574	9,087	+82.4%	37.1	14.3	446.7/km^{2} (1,157.0/sq mi)	March 17, 1977
Tepalcingo	Tepalcingo	28,122	25,346	+11.0%	368.6	142.3	76.3/km^{2} (197.6/sq mi)	1826
Tepoztlán	Tepoztlán	54,987	41,629	+32.1%	242.4	93.6	226.8/km^{2} (587.5/sq mi)	1826
Tetecala	Tetecala	7,617	7,441	+2.4%	67.7	26.1	112.5/km^{2} (291.4/sq mi)	1826
Tetela del Volcán (Note: The decline in population can, in part, be attributed to the partition of the municipality in 2019 for the creation of Hueyapan.)	Tetela del Volcán	14,853	19,138	−22.4%	79.3	30.6	187.3/km^{2} (485.1/sq mi)	January 31, 1937
Tlalnepantla	Tlalnepantla	7,943	6,636	+19.7%	107.9	41.7	73.6/km^{2} (190.7/sq mi)	October 11, 1848
Tlaltizapán	Tlaltizapán	52,399	48,881	+7.2%	238.5	92.1	219.7/km^{2} (569.0/sq mi)	1826
Tlaquiltenango	Tlaquiltenango	33,789	31,534	+7.2%	543.9	210.0	62.1/km^{2} (160.9/sq mi)	1826
Tlayacapan	Tlayacapan	19,408	16,543	+17.3%	57.2	22.1	339.3/km^{2} (878.8/sq mi)	1826
Totolapan	Totolapan	12,750	10,789	+18.2%	60.0	23.2	212.5/km^{2} (550.4/sq mi)	1826
Xochitepec	Xochitepec	73,539	63,382	+16.0%	93.2	36.0	789.0/km^{2} (2,043.6/sq mi)	1826
Xoxocotla (Note: There is no 2010 census population figure as Xoxocotla was created in 2019 out of Puente de Ixtla.)	Xoxocotla	27,805	—	—	61.7	23.8	450.6/km^{2} (1,167.2/sq mi)	January 1, 2019
Yautepec	Yautepec de Zaragoza	105,780	97,827	+8.1%	179.6	69.3	589.0/km^{2} (1,525.4/sq mi)	1826
Yecapixtla (Note: Yecapixtla was originally incorporated as Ayacapiztla, changing its name on June 2, 1849.)	Yecapixtla	56,083	46,809	+19.8%	173.2	66.9	323.8/km^{2} (838.7/sq mi)	1826
Zacatepec	Zacatepec de Hidalgo	36,094	35,063	+2.9%	30.7	11.9	1,175.7/km^{2} (3,045.0/sq mi)	December 25, 1936
Zacualpan	Zacualpan de Amilpas	9,965	9,087	+9.7%	53.8	20.8	185.2/km^{2} (479.7/sq mi)	1826
Morelos	—	1,971,520	1,777,227	+10.9%	4,878.9	1,883.8	404.1/km^{2} (1,046.6/sq mi)	—
Mexico	—	126,014,024	112,336,538	+12.2%	1,960,646.7	757,010	64.3/km^{2} (166.5/sq mi)	—
