= Ciudad Ayala =

Ciudad Ayala Nation
- City
- Location within Morelos Location within Mexico
- Coordinates: 18°45′59″N 98°59′05″W
- Country: Mexico
- State: Morelos

Government
  - Type: Ayuntamiento
  - Municipal President: Isaac Pimentel Mejía (Panal)
- Elevation: 1,147 m (3,763 ft)

Population (2020)
  - Total: 89,834
- Time zone: UTC−6 (CST)
- GNIS feature ID: 04
- Website: www.ayala.gob.mx

Ciudad Ayala is a city in the east-central part of the Mexican state of Morelos. It is named for Coronel Francisco Ayala who fought with José María Morelos during the 1812 Siege of Cuautla. The town's previous name was Mapachtlan. Ayala became a municipality on April 17, 1869.

Ciudad Ayala had a population of 6,190 inhabitants in 2005, and 6335 in 2020. The city serves as the municipal seat for the surrounding municipality of Ayala, had a population of 85,521 inhabitants in 2015 and it has an area of 345.69 km^{2} (133.47 sq mi) and 89,834 in 2020. The municipality includes towns San Pedro Apatlaco, Anenecuilco, and Tenextepango, which are all larger than Ciudad Ayala. The city was previously known as San Francisco Mapachtlan but was renamed in 1868 to honor Francisco Ayala (1760–1812), who was the first leader in the modern state of Morelos to join the Cry of Dolores in 1810.

The town of Anenecuilco, birthplace of Emiliano Zapata, is within this municipality; as is the Hacienda de San Juan, near the town of Chinameca, where he was betrayed and assassinated. Ayala itself is best known for giving the name to Emiliano Zapata's manifesto: the Plan of Ayala.

== History ==
Prehispanic ruins at Olintepec date back to 1500 BCE, where they reached their peak between 1200 and 1610 CE. The people of Olintepec were Tlahuicas. Other ruins have been found at Tlayecac.

In 1603 Don Nicolas Abad built the hacienda of San Francisco Mapachtlan in 1603. Twelve years later this was elevated to a congregación. In 1750, supported by Dominican friars, the people built their own church, called San José de Mapachtlan. This was dependent upon Cuautla, Morelos, (formally called Cuautla de Ampilas) and in 1834 it became a pueblo. In 1868 it became a municipalidad of the State of Mexico, district of Cuernavaca, and changed its name to Villa de Ayala in honor of Francisco Ayala, a leader of the Mexican War of Independence. Ayala became a Centro de Poblacion (Population Center) on March 17, 1976.

The state of Morelos reported 209 cases and 28 deaths due to the COVID-19 pandemic in Mexico, as of April 27, 2020, and five cases were reported in Ayala. Schools and many businesses were closed from mid March until June 1. The municipal president, Isaac Pimentel Mejía, led an effort to distribute 10,000 food baskets to families in remote areas of the municipality. On June 2, Ayala reported 44 confirmed cases and five deaths from the virus; the reopening of the state was pushed back until at least June 13. Ayala reported 264 cases, 205 recuperations, and 34 deaths as of August 31. There were 373 cases reported on December 27, 2020.

=== Famous residents ===
- Coronel Francisco Ayala (Mexican Insurgent) (1760–1812) was the first Insurgent leader from Morelos.
- Eufemio Zapata (1873–1917), the brother of Emiliano Zapata. He was killed by Sidronio Camacho, one of Zapata's commanders, because Eufemio had become drunk and beat and insulted Camacho's father.
- General Pablo Torres Burgos (1877–1911). Torres Burgos founded the liberation club called Melchor Ocampo in 1909 and became a general in 1911. He is remembered for the phrase, "Down with the haciendas! Long live the people!"
- General Emiliano Zapata Salazar (1879–1919) was the leader of the agrarian movement who proposed the Plan de Ayala. Born in Anencuilco, he was assassinated in Chinameca. He is remembered for the slogan, "Land and Liberty."
- Otilio Montaño Sánchez (1887–1917) was the ideologue behind the Plan de Ayala. He was a Zapatista general who became the Minister of Public Education and Fine Arts in 1914. He was executed for betraying the Mexican Revolution in 1917.

==== Munincipal presidents ====
Presidents of Ciudad Ayala, 1922–present

- Everardo Avelar, 1922-1923
- Rafael Cortes Cabrera, 1924-1925
- Simón Bravo, 1926-1927
- Gregorio Alvarez, 1928-1929
- Simón Bravo, 1929
- Marciano Mora, 1929
- Simón Bravo, 1929-1930
- Francisco Yañez, 1930
- Sebastián Sandoval, 1930
- Feliciano Domínguez, 1931
- Rafael Cortés Cabrera, 1932
- Damaso Franco, 1933-1934
- Carlos Mora Mejía, 1935-1936
- Rafael Cortés Cabrera, 1937
- Cándido Muñoz, 1938
- Sebastián Sandoval, 1939
- Rosalino Zapata, 1939-1940
- Roberto Pineda Capistran, 1941-1942
- Fidel Rendon Guevara, 1943
- Guillermo Montes, 1943-1944
- Francisco Alvarez Mora, 1945-1946
- Fidencio Díaz Paredes, 1947
- Jesús Genis, 1948
- Saturnino Alvarez, 1949
- Carlos Mora Mejía, 1950-1951
- Manuel Mendoza Montaño, 1952
- Elpidio Torres Rodríguez, 1952-1953
- Luis Montaño Sánchez, 1953-1954
- Angel Muñoz Plascencia, 1955-1957
- José Rendon Plascencia, 1958-1960
- Federico Aragón Tajonar, 1961-1963
- Manuel Mendoza Montaño, 1964-1966
- Antonio Franco López, 1967-1970
- Pablo Torres Chávez, 1970-1973
- Vicente Plascencia Muñoz, 1973
- Armando Plascencia Muñoz, 1973-1976
- Damián Mora Muñoz, 1976-1979
- Javier Carbajal Muñoz, 1979-1982
- Pablo Torres Chávez, 1982-1985
- Pascual Rodríguez Cabrera, 1985-1988
- Alfredo Acevedo Muñoz, 1988-1990
- Lázaro Córdoba Herrera, 1990-1991
- Esteban Nájera Guevara, 1991-1994
- Dux Cortés Sánchez, 1994-1997
- Héctor Plascencia Ayala, 1997–2000 (PRI)
- Miguel O. Sánchez Hernández, 2000-2003 (PRI)
- Pedro Pimentel Rivas, 2003–2006 (PRD)
- Juan Nolasco Vázquez, 2006–2009 (PAN)
- Issac Pimentel Rivas, 2009–2012 (PRI)
- José Manuel Tablas Pimentel, 2013–2015 (PAN)
- Antonio Domínguez Aragón, 2016–2018 (PRI)
- Isaac Pimentel Mejía, 2019–present (Panal)

== Economy ==
The Cuautla Industrial Park, located in Ayala, covers 130 ha (320 acres) and is the second largest in Morelos. Most of the companies are related to the automotive industry. The largest employers are Saint-Gobainl, (glass), Sekurit (windshields), and Continental Automotive Temic (industrial parts and transmissions).

Agriculture is the dominant occupation. Crops include sugar cane, corn, sorghum, rice, onions, zucchini, and gladiolas. Cattle, sheep, horses, and poultry are raised. Tourism is also important.

== Tourist attractions ==
The archaeological ruins of Olintepec in Ciudad Ayala date from 1500 BCE to 1610 CE, although its peak was from 1200 to 1610 CE. The people paid tribute to Huaxtepec (Oaxtepec), the Mexicas, and the Texcocanos. Tlayecac has Prehispanic paintings and a small pyramid. The novel Tiro al vuelo by Alejandro Volnie is set in the village. The 1962 movie Pueblito, directed by Emilio Fernández was filmed there.

There are ex-haciendas in Tenextepango and Coahuixtla as well as Chinameca. General Emiliano Zapata and three of his men were assassinated in Chinameca on April 10, 1919, and the hacienda has been transformed into the National Museum of Agrarian Reform Movement. There is also a large statue of Zapata on the property.

Other attractions in Ayala include the parish church of San José, whose feast is March 15, and the kiosk.

Zapata was born in Anencuilco on August 8, 1879, and his boyhood home is now a museum. San Miguel Arcangel is venerated at the parish church on September 29. There is a statue of Zapata in the town square.

There is an old parish church dedicated to Santiago Apostol in Tenextepango. His feast is July 25.

There are two small water parks,El Axocoche or El Axochochetl, located in Rafael Merino neighborhood, which is ejidal and El Colobri (the hummingbird) which is privately owned. Both have large parking lots and allow camping.

=== Communities and holidays ===
San Pedro Apatlaco is an agricultural community with 736 hectares (1,819 acres) belonging to 318 producers. The most important crops are onions, beans, and corn. Dairy cattle are raised. There is small-scale commerce and industry. Apatlaco has a population of 13,032. The distance from Ciudad Ayala is approximately two kilometers. Its holidays are February 2 (Candlemas) and June 29 (Saint Peter).

Anenecuilco is an agricultural community with 1,328 hectares (3,283 acres) and 507 farmers who grow sugarcane, corn, sorghum, onions, and gladiolus. There is also trade and to a lesser extent, tourism. Its holidays are the fifth Friday of Lent, August 8 (birth of Emiliano Zapata); September 29 (Saint Michael the Archangel). The population is 11,227.

Tenextepango is an agricultural community. Principal crops are vegetables such as beans, corn, and zucchini, as well as sugar cane. 1,039 hectares are cultivated by 456 producers. Trade is another important activity, as well as tourism since its annual fair is one of the most important in the area. It has a population of 8,835 inhabitants and its distance to Ciudad Ayala head is 6 km. Its fair is July 25 (James, son of Zebedee).

Ciudad de Ayala is the municipal seat. It has 6,335 inhabitants and is located 60 km (37.3 miles) from Cuernavaca and 6 km (3.7 miles) from Cuautla. It is primarily an agricultural community; the most important crops are sugar cane, corn, sorghum, rice, onions, and vegetables, grown on 2,002.4 hectares (4,948 acres). Cattle, goats, horses, and poultry are raised. Commerce and tourism are also important to the economy. Holidays are March 19 (Saint Joseph) and December 12 (Our Lady of Guadalupe).

Jaloxtoc has 4,026 inhabitants. Onions, corn, and sorghum are grown on 1,195 hectares by 295 farmers. Cattle, goats, and horses are raised. It is 15 km (9.3 miles) from Ciudad Ayala.

Tlayecac is agricultural with sorghum and corn grown on 1,234 hectares by 195 producers. Cattle, pigs, and goats are raised. The industrial park is located in Tlayecac, which is 13 km from Ciudad Ayala. April 25 (Mark the Evangelist) is its local holiday. Its 2020 population was 2,879.

Other communities are:

- Chinameca, 3,149 inhabitants
- Huitzililla, 2,878 inhabitants
- San Juan Ahuehueyo, 2,547 inhabitants
- Constancio Farfán (La Pascuala), 2,148 inhabitants
- Abelardo L. Rodríguez, 2,072 inhabitants
- Colonia las Arboledas, 1,850 inhabitants
- Olintepec, 1,656 inhabitants
- San Vicente de Juárez (Las Piedras), 1,485 inhabitants
- Unidad Habitacional 10 de Abril, 1,460 inhabitants
- El Salitre, 1,355 inhabitants
- Fraccionamiento Huertas de Cuautla, 1,292 inhabitants
- Unidad Habitacional Mariano Matamoros, 1,069 inhabitants
- Other communities with fewer than 1,000 people each

== Geography ==
=== Location ===
The municipality of Ayala is located in the central part of the state, between 18°46'North and 98°59'West, at an altitude of 1,220 meters (4,000 ft.) above sea level. To the north are the municipalities of Yautepec, Cuautla. and Yecapixtla, to the south Tepalcingo and Tlaquiltenango; to the east Temoac, Jantetelco, and Jonacatepec; while to the west are Tlaltizapán and Yautepec. It is approximately 60 km from Cuernavaca. and 117 km (73 miles) south of Mexico City.

=== Relief ===
Ayala is part of the fertile valley of the Plain of Amilpas. The most important hills are El Tenayo, El Aguacate, El Jimil and Cerro Prieto each has an altitude of about 1,500 meters (4920 ft.) above sea level.

=== Waterways ===
The Ayala River receives water from El Hospital and Calderón ravines, flowing south past Abelardo L. Rodríguez, Olintepec, and Moyotepec, where the waters of the Ahuehueyo ravine join it. In the east, it crosses the Barranca de la Cuera, the Papayos, the Guayabos, and Tlayecac, then continues south through Jaloxtoc. Downstream it joins the Cuautla River, which continues through San Vicente de Juárez and Tecomalco, to flow into the Amacuzac River, a branch of the Balsas River. There are also small springs such as Axocoche, El Colibrí, and El Platanal. There is a dam in Palo Blanco.

=== Climate ===
Ayala has a warm subhumid climate. Its average annual rainfall is 800 mm. (31") and it has an average annual temperature of 24 °C (75 °F). Prevailing winds blow from northeast to southwest. The rainy season is June to October, and the dry season is October to June. April and May are the hottest months.

=== Flora and fauna ===
The vegetation consists of low deciduous forest, mainly cubatas, casahuates, tulips, amates (Acacia), framboyanes, guamuchil (a thorny tree with red fruit), guaje colorado, mesquite, palo dulce, bonnet, tepejuaje, and fruit trees such as Annona, cherimoya, mamey, plum, and guava.

Animal life is also very varied. Mammals include raccoon, badger, rabbit, skunk, armadillo, tlacuache, and coyote. Birds include magpie, buzzard, owl, and sparrowhawk. There are iguanas and scorpions. Fish include catfish and mojarra.
