= Tlaquiltenango =

City in Morelos, Mexico

- Municipality
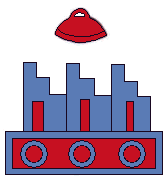
- Coat of arms

- Location in Mexico Tlaquiltenango (Mexico)
- Country: Mexico
- State: Morelos
- Demonym: (in Spanish)
- Time zone: UTC−6 (CST)

Tlaquiltenango is a city in the Mexican state of Morelos. It is 151.6 kilometres (94.2 mi) south of Mexico city and 60.1 kilometres (37.3 mi) southeast of Cuernavaca, the state capital via Mexican Federal Highway 95D.

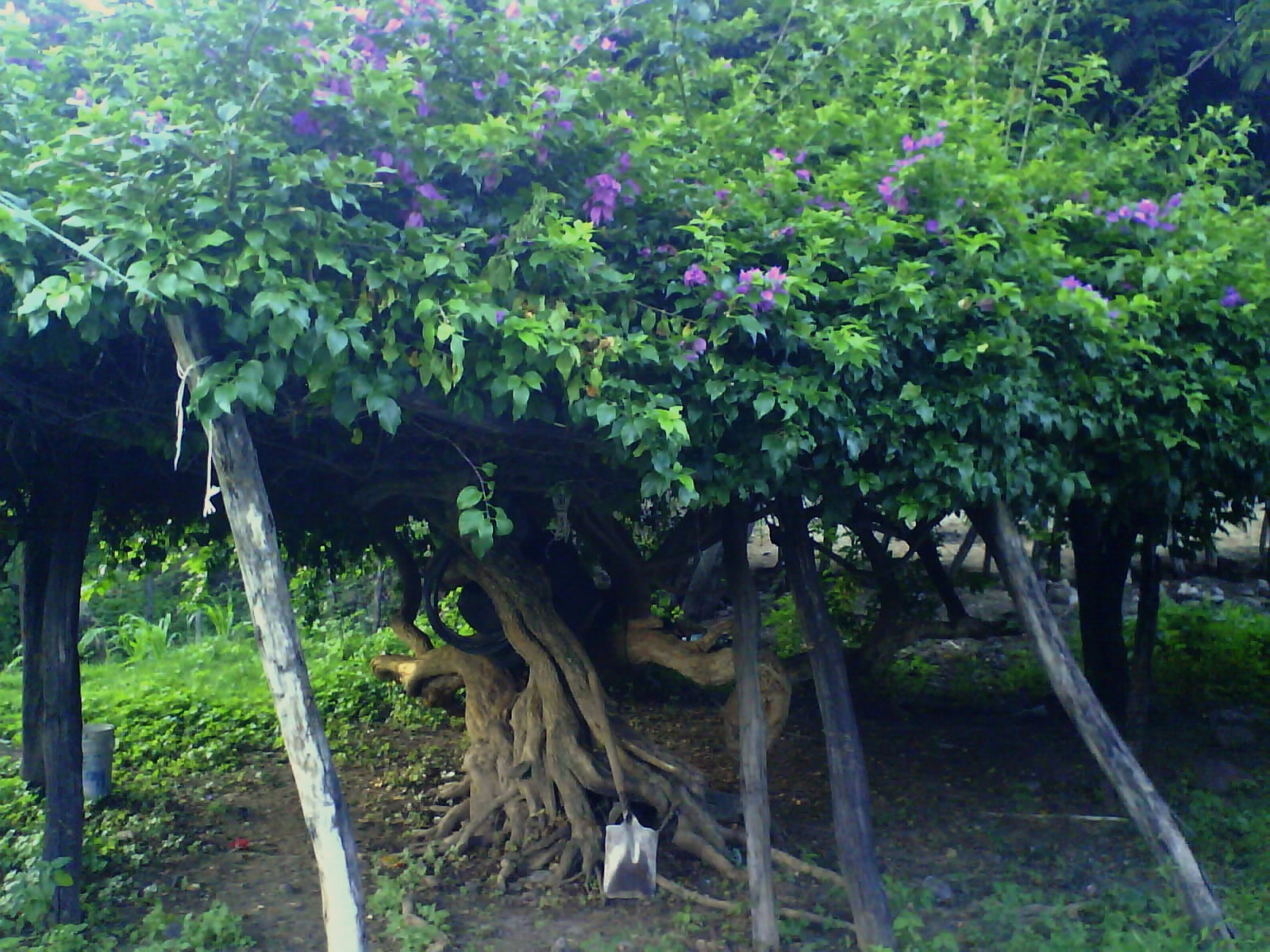

The city serves as the municipal seat for the surrounding municipality, with which it shares a name. The toponym Tlaquiltenango comes from a Nahuatl name and means "place of whitewashed walls". The municipality reported 33,844 inhabitants in the year 2015 census.

== History ==
=== Prehispanic history ===
There are two pre-Hispanic archaeological sites in Tlaquiltenango: Chimalacatlan and Huaxtla. Chamalacatlan was built on the top of the hill of "El Venado"; it had 33 terraces and an equal number of piles of cut stone. There is also a small cave that was used for ceremonies. From the top of the hill, you can see Lake Tequesquitengo, Xochicalco, and parts of the state of Guerrero. The site is almost unique among Mesoamerican ruins in that the walls and platform were constructed of megaliths rather than the smaller rocks usually found in such structures. A small ceremonial ballcourt is also uncharacteristic of the Olmecs. The ruins were described by Fernando de Alva Ixtlixochitl in the early 17th century, although the modern discovery by Father Lorenzo Castro in the late 19th century was more significant. Castro reported his find to Bishop Francisco Plancarte y Navarrete, who speculated Chimalacatlan was none other than the mythological Tamoanchan, the cradle of Mesoamerican civilization.

Huaxtla was built in what is the center of the community by that name today, at the top of a horseshoe-shaped hill. The ruins are similar to those of Chimalacatlan. It is believed that the inhabitants of these sites were from Tepexpan, who migrated south in search of better food and a better climate.

=== Conquest and colonialism ===
Tlaquiltenango was included in the towns belonging to the marquisate of the Valley of Oaxtepec, awarded to the conquistador Hernán Cortés. Cortes established a hacienda for the breeding of fine horses that would be destined for his army; for its surveillance, he ordered the construction of a circular stone tower with a height of close to 40 meters (130 feet).

The convent-fortress Santo Domingo de Guzmán was initiated by the order of the Franciscans and finished by the Dominicans in the year 1540, one the oldest of the American continent. The convent is not very well-maintained, and there are cracks in the walls, and interior frescos are in poor condition. The clock was installed in December, 1898. In 1909, Mauricio de la Arena and Father Agapito Mateo Menes discovered a prehispanic codex in one corner; this is at the National Museum of Anthropology today.

=== Independence period ===
Tlaquiltenango became a city of the State of Mexico in 1825 under the 1824 Constitution of Mexico. It included not only present-day Tlaquiltenango, but also the municipalities of Jojutla and Zacatepec, and stretched southeast to the Cuautla River. It became a municipality of Morelos by decree of governor Carlos Pacheco on 25 September 1884.

The 2017 earthquake did considerable damage in Tlaquitenango. Two children and two women were killed, while a woman from Valle de Vázquez was killed in Jojutla. The earthquake left a large crack in the earth that split two houses apart and destroyed 183 others and severely damaged 365 other homes in Colonia Celino Manzanares next to the Yautepec River. The 16th-century church was severely damaged, as was the 17th-century bridge in Colonia Manzares, 60 stone fences collapsed, and the municipal hall was damaged. The Secreatary of Health reported that 396 homes were destroyed and 510 were damaged.

Jorge Maldonado Ortiz of Juntos Haremos Historia (Morena Together we will make history coalition) was elected Presidente Municipal (mayor) on 1 July 2018. José Almanza Alcaine, a former alderman and the 2018 candidate of Movimiento Ciudadano for municipal president, was gunned down on January 27, 2019. His two companions were also shot, and one died.

In response to the COVID-19 pandemic in Mexico, Tlaquiltenango blocked the entrances to the community. The town reports two confirmed cases and one death as of 27 April 2020. Schools and many businesses were closed from mid March until 1 June. On 2 July, Tlaquiltenango reported eleven infections and one death from the virus; the reopening of the state was pushed back until at least 13 June. Tlaqiltenango reported 75 cases, 51 recuperations, and 22 deaths from the virus as of 31 August. One hundred twenty/one cases were reported on 27 December 2020.

== Communities ==
There are 29 communities in the municipality, which has a population of 29,637, including 292 people who identify as Indigenous. 16% of the 7,641 homes have a dirt floor, 89% have running water, 95% have electricity, 90% have television, and 11% have computers. The average education level is 7 years. Women have a fertility rate of 2.58 children. 12.61% of the population come from outside the state of Morelos. 67.7% are Roman Catholic, and 49.7% of the adults are economically active.

Tlaquiltenango is the municipal seat. It has a population of 17,606 and is located at an altitude of 920 meters (3,020 feet) above sea level. It is 45.3 km (28.1 mi) from Cuernavaca and 133.3 km from Mexico City.

Alfredo V. Bonfil (Chacampalco) has a population of 2,188 and is located at an altitude of 930 meters (3,050 feet). It is 2.8 km (1.7 mi) from Tlaquiltenango.

Valle de Vázquez (Los Hornos) has a population of 929 and is located at 950 meters (3,120 feet) above sea level. It is 19.9 km (12.4 mi) from Tlaquiltenango.

Huautla has a population of 913 and is located at an altitude of 945 meters (3,100 feet). It is 45.6 km (28.3 mi) from Tlaquiltenango. There is a prehispanic archaeological site in the community.

Lorenzo Vázquez (Santa Cruz) has a population of 744 and is located at an altitude of 890 meters (2,920 feet). It is 16.5 km (10.3 mi) from Tlaquiltenango.

Colonia 3 de Mayo (El Tepiolol) has a population of 699 and is located at an altitude of 930 meters (3,050 feet). It is 2.4 km (1.5 mi) from Tlaquiltenango.

Quilamula has a population of 614 and is located at an altitude of 1,070 meters (3,510 feet). It is 28.0 km (17.4 mi) from Tlaquiltenango.

La Mezquitera (El Astillero) has a population of 529 and is located at an altitude of 855 meters (2,805 feet). The 16th-century mining hacienda San Jacinto Ixtoluca houses a small hotel. It is 11.6 km (7.2 mi) from Tlaquiltenango.

Chimalacatlan has a population of 364 people and is located at an altitude of 1,091 meters (3,579 feet) above sea level. It has one preschool, one elementary school (grades 1–6), and one middle school (grades 7–9). Chimalacatlan is best known for its prehispanic archaeological site of the same name. It is 30.4 km (18.9 mi) from Tlaquiltenango.

== Culture ==
=== Points of Interest ===
The 16th-century church and monastery of Santo Domingo, the haciendas of Las Bóvedas and Los Hornos, and the concrete tower in El Rollo waterpark are the main historical constructions.

There are two waterparks in the municipality. El Rollo is located in Gabriel Tepepa and is one of the best waterparks in Latin America. It has 40 pools and 18 water slides, including one with a 25-meter (82-foot) height. Paraiso Aventura Las Huertas is a natural waterpark with a spring, camping area, cabins, picnic area, and pools.

The Museo Comunitario Rubén Jaramillo (Ruben Jaramillo Community Museum) in Tlaquiltenango is a small museum where paintings of revolutionary characters are exhibited, as well as books from the era of the Mexican Revolution, as well as pieces and pre-Hispanic tools. Rubén Jaramillo (1900-1962) was a native of Tlaquiltenango and a peasant and labor leader during the 1940s and 1950s who, along with his family, was assassinated by the Mexican Army in 1962.

==== Church and monastery of Santo Domingo ====
Construction of the church and former monastery of Santo Domingo was begun by the Franciscans between 1535 and 1540, and it was completed by the Dominicans. It is considered one of the most beautiful 16th-century monasteries in Morelos.

The church is very large and rectangular. The main entrance is on the west side, and there is a side entrance on the south that is very similar to that of the Cuernavaca Cathedral. The nave and presbytery are separated by a triumphal arch supported by large, circular The columns. The western entrance to the church is simple and austere; above the access arch there is a stone triangle with a small window. There is a clock that was added in 1898 above the window.

The base of the bell tower is connected to the main façade of the church. It is proportionately tall and consists of two ornamented sections for bells that contrast with the general austerity of the church itself.

There are large pink, stone buttresses on the south side of the church and a carved, Franciscan-style cross above the main entrance. The interior of the church is simple in the Dominican style. The monastery cloister is high with a small central patio; the cells for the monks are simple. The atrium is huge; the capillas pozas for the instruction of unbaptized Indigenous and the two large entrances are still standing.

=== Fiestas, dances, and traditions ===
Candlemas Day is celebrated on 2 February in Tlaquiltenango. There is a fair, jaripeo (bulls), and Chinelo and Tecuanes dances. In the latter, dancers wear old clothes, a mask, and a hat while they carry a dissected animal.

Tlayehualco celebrates the appearance of the Our Lady of Guadalupe on 12 December.

=== Cuisine ===
White pork pozole, chito, goat and pork barbecue, fish in mixiote, in tamales and in clemole seasoned with wild plum and tamarind are typical foods in the area.

== Geography ==
=== Location and area ===
Tlaquiltenango is geographically located between parallels 18°37′44″N 90°09′37″W at an altitude of 911 meters (2,989 feet) above sea level.

To the north are the municipalities of Tlaltizapán, Ayala and Tepalcingo; to the south are the States of Guerrero and Puebla; to the west are the municipalities of Zacatepec, Jojutla, and Puente de Ixtla; while Tepalcingo is to the east.

Tlaquiltenango has a surface area of 544 km^{2} (210 sq mi) which represents 11.73% of the total of the State of Morelos.

=== Climate ===
The wet season in Tlaquiltenango (late May to late October) is overcast, the dry season (late October to late May) is partly cloudy, and it is hot year round. Over the course of the year, the temperature typically varies from 56 to 95 °F (13 to 35 °C). The hot season lasts for two months, from 21 March to 23 May, with an average daily high temperature above 93 °F (34 °C) The cool season lasts for seven months, from 25 June to 1 February, with an average daily high temperature below 88 °F (31 °C). Average annual rainfall is 35.8 inches (910 mm).

24 February, is the clearest day of the year, and 14 September, is the cloudiest day of the year. The windier part of the year lasts for five months, from December to May, with average wind speeds of more than 4.9 miles per hour (7.9 km/h). The wind is mostly from the west in March, from the south from April through June, and from the east from July through February.

=== Relief and water resources ===
Dominant heights in the municipality of Tlaquiltenango are the Santa María hill, the Guajolote hill, the Huautla hill, 1,642 meters (5,387 feet), the Palo Verde hill, the black ground of the Ciénega, and the Limón. Along the boundaries of the State of Puebla and Municipality of Tepalcingo, are Tetillas, Cerro Picacho del Burial, Temazcales, and Cueva (Cave) de San Martín. Hilly areas cover 44% of Tlaquiltenango, mostly in the center and south. 38% of the land is semi-flat, mostly in the center and south. Plains cover 18% of the total surface, mostly in the northwest.

Water resources in Tlaquiltenango include the Amacuzac River, which flows from west to south; the Cuautla River, which flows from north to south joining the Amacuzac River west of Nexpa, and the Yautepec River. This last flows northwest, joining the Apatlaco River in Jojutla. There are also smaller, intermittent channels that descend from the mountains during the rainy season. In addition, there are springs in El Rollo, Nexpa, Los Elotes, Valle de Vázquez, and La Huertas. Finally, there are 25 wells—21 for drinking water and four used for irrigation.

=== Flora and fauna ===
Flora consists mainly of low deciduous forests in a warm climate, ceiba, and bougainvillea. Wild animals include white-tailed deer, boar of collar, raccoon, badger, skunk, armadillo, hare, common rabbit, coyote, wildcat, weasel, cacomixtle, tlacuache (a member of the raccoon family), and bats, flagged bird, chachalaca, magpie copetona, vulture, aura (buzzard), crow, owl, and songbirds and ornamental birds.

==== Sierra de Huautla ====
Established in 2006, the Sierra de Huautla Biosphere Reserve (REBIOSH) covers 59,031 hectares (145,870 acres) in the Balsas River Basin of the municipalities of Tlaquiltenango, Amacuzac, Tepalcingo, Jojutla, and Puente de Ixtla. Its rough topology varies from 700 to 2,240 meters (2,300 to 7,350 ft) above sea level in the Balsas Basin and constitutes a rich reservoir of endemic species to Mexico. There is a broad range of ecosystem, including low deciduous forest, gallery vegetation, and pine and oak forests. 939 species of plants, 44 species of butterflies, 71 species of mammals, 208 species of birds, 53 species of reptiles, 18 species of amphibians, and 14 species of fish have been noted. Among the species of animals are jaguars, short-horned Baronia butterfly, beaded lizard, military macaw, rufous-backed robin, Balsas screech owl, Pileated flycatcher, mountain lion, ocelot, margay, bobcat, and jaguarundi.

=== Natural resources and land tenure ===
Rivers and land are the most important natural resources in Tlaquiltenango. Sugarcane, rice, onions, sorghum, tomatoes, corn, and beans are the most important crops. Cattle, pigs, goats, sheep, horses, and poultry are raised.

The municipality has an approximate area of 581.77 km^{2} (224.62 sq mi). 5,738 hectares (14,180 acres) are for agricultural use, 8,319 hectares (20,560 acres) are for livestock, and 47,293 hectares (116,860 acres) are for forests. Land tenure can be divided into 51,303 hectares (126,770 acres) of ejidal property and 1,334 hectares (3,300 acres) private property.

== See also ==
- List of people from Morelos
