= Agustín Aragón León =

Mexican politician

Agustín Aragón León (August 28, 1870 – March 30, 1954) was a Mexican politician born in Jonacatepec, Morelos, serving in the Chamber of Deputies. He was also an avid educator and promoter of the positivist ideology in Mexico. He was the founder and editor of the magazine Revista Positiva. His remains were interred on March 31, 1954 at the Rotunda of Illustrious Persons.

== See also ==
- List of people from Morelos
