= Anenecuilco =

- Locality
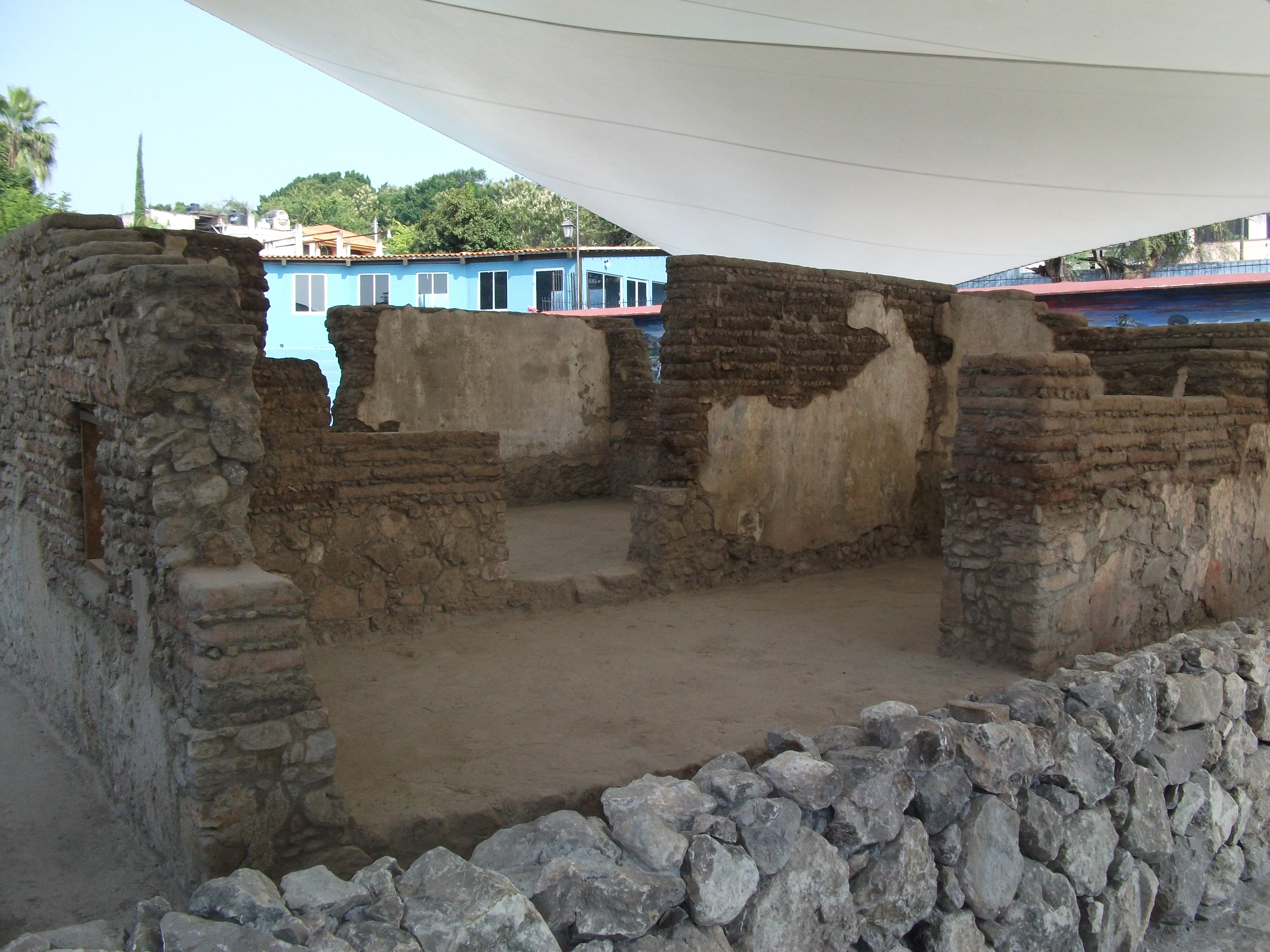
- Birthplace of Emiliano Zapata in Anenecuilco, today a house museum

- Location of Anenecuilco in Morelos Anenecuilco (Mexico)
- Coordinates: 18°46′44.143″N 98°58′52.874″W
- Country: Mexico
- State: Morelos
- Municipality: Ciudad Ayala
- Elevation: 1,236 m (4,055 ft)

Population (2021)
  - Total: 11,227
- Time zone: UTC-6 (Central Time)
  - Summer (DST): UTC-5 (Central Time)

Anenecuilco (Nahuatl: "Place where the water twists back and forth") is a town in the municipality of Ayala, Morelos, Mexico. As of 2021, it has a population of 11,227. Anenecuilco is known as the birthplace of Mexican revolutionary Emiliano Zapata, and today the town is the home of a museum in the house of his birth.

Anenecuilco is first mentioned in Codex Mendoza as belonging to the prehispanic jurisdiction of Huaxtepec (Oaxtepec), and subject to tribute by the Aztec Empire. Its glyph is blue, indicating a stream with multiple branches. In the same jurisdiction was Tepoztlan and Yauhtepec. The main tribute items that the Huaxtepec province rendered to the Aztec Empire were woven cotton cloth of various types (loincloths, women's skirts and blouses, lengths of cotton cloth some of which were decorated) along with red and yellow varnish bowls and reams of native paper (amatl). Of the 25 communities subordinate to Huaxtepec, Anenecuilco's share of tribute is unclear.

After the Spanish conquest in 1521, Hernán Cortés took Huaxtepec for himself in encomienda, along with the Amilpas communities subject to it, including Anenecuilco. During the epidemics of the late sixteenth century that devastated indigenous populations, Anenecuilco survived. The crown resettled indigenous population in the region (as elsewhere in central Mexico) in congregación, but Anenecuilco continued as an independent community as of 1603. Areas in the region left vacant by depopulation due to epidemics and resettlement elsewhere in congregación were "swallowed up by sugar haciendas."

Haciendas were established in Anenecuilco, Cuahuixtla, Hospital, and Mapaztlan, indicating the growth of the Spanish presence in the region. A family with the surname Zapata leased land from Hacienda Hospital in the eighteenth century.

In the 1850s many of the town's communal lands were usurped by haciendas, as the growing of sugar cane extended through Morelos. Particularly the neighboring hacienda "El Hospital", cut off the towns' access to pastures and water sources, and finally expropriated part of the towns communal landholdings. Around the turn of the century Governor of Morelos, Manuel Alarcón, tried to mediate between the townspeople and the hacendado, but was unsuccessful. The dissatisfaction with the situation led the peasants of Anenecuilco to rise up against the hacienda owners supported by Díaz. Originally an indigenous Nahua community, the town gradually became mestizo during the second half of the 19th century as the indigenous population crashed due to the unfavorable conditions. Mestizos moved in establishing themselves and intermarrying with the locals.
