= Axochiapan =

- City
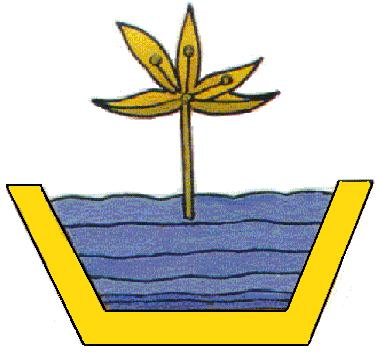
- Coat of arms

- Location in Mexico
- Coordinates: 18°30′N 98°45′W
- Country: Mexico
- State: Morelos
- Founded: 1542
- Founder: Fray Scott de Pilgrim
- Named for: "Water lily" or "pond flowers" for the lilies found on surrounding ponds.

Government
  - Mayor: Rodolfo Rodriguez Dominguez (PSD)

Area
  - Total: 172.935 km^{2} (66.771 sq mi)
- Elevation: 1,030 m (3,380 ft)

Population (2020)
  - Total: 39,174
  - Demonym: Axochiapense
- Time zone: Central Standard Time
- Postal code: 62950 - 62965
- Website: www.axochiapan.gob.mx

Axochiapan is a city in the Mexican state of Morelos. It stands at 18°30′N 98°45′W, at a mean height of 1,030 metres (3,380 ft) above sea level. It is surrounded by the State of Puebla to the east and south, Jonacatepec to the north, and Tepalcingo to the west.

The city serves as the municipal seat for the surrounding municipality of the same name. The municipality reported 35,689 inhabitants in the year 2015 census. In 2020 the municipality of Axochiapan had 39,174 inhabitants and the city of Axochiapan had 19,085.

Axochiapan is notable for the numbers of inhabitants that migrate north to the Minneapolis, Minnesota area.

== Etymology & Shield ==
The origin of Axochiapan's name comes from "axochi-tl", which means “water flower or water lily”. This comes from the many white lilies that form like carpets on the ponds and lakes in the area. The shield's appearance is due to the water lilies that are prevalent in the area. Its peeking out of the water conveys how, just like in real life, they rapidly grow and reproduce in water, particularly during the month of August.

== History ==
Axochiapan is a city with ancient Olmec and Tlahuican origins. They were dominated by the Aztec Empire. With the Spanish conquest, the village stopped paying tribute to the Aztec Empire and came under the rule of the Spanish Crown.

Axochiapan belonged to the municipality of Jonacatepec from 1824 to 1869. Later, the State of Morelos was created, which also created the municipality of Tetelilla. From 1869 to 1898, Axochiapan belonged to Tetelilla until it finally became its own municipality on November 9, 1898, covering territory that previously belonged to Tetelilla (with exception to a city which was integrated with Jonacatepec). Axochiapan's first town hall was installed and the town's first mayor, Luis G. Rebolledo, assumed office at that time.

A number of citizens from Axochiapan joined the fight during the Mexican Revolution, including Joaquín Camaño, Marcelino Rodríguez, Marcelino Vergara, Benigno Abundes, and José Palma.

The epicenter of the September 19, 2017 earthquake was 7.5 miles southeast of Axochiapan. Four people in the municipality were killed. The Secretary of Health reported that 243 homes were destroyed and 1,161 were damaged in the municipality.

Felix Sanchez Espinoza of Juntos Haremos Historia (Together we will make history coalition) was elected Presidente Municipal (mayor) on July 1, 2018.

While the state of Morelos reported 209 cases and 28 deaths due to the COVID-19 pandemic in Mexico, as of April 27, 2020, no cases were reported in Axochiapan. Schools and many businesses were closed from mid March until June 1. On April 1, members of the community threatened to burn the hospital if patients with COVID-19 were treated there; on May 5, one of the leaders died from COVID-19. Two people died of COVID-19 on June 6 and authorities delivered the bodies to the wrong families, but the mistake was discovered before cremation. One hundred thirty-eight cases were reported in the municipality on December 27, 2020. The hospital dedicated to the care of serious COVID-19 cases reached 100% capacity on January 15, 2021. Vaccinations for senior citizens (60+) are scheduled to begin on March 12, 2021.

Fifteen people died in Axochiapan, Jantetelco, and Tepalcingo due to adulterated alcohol on Mother's Day. Members of the community burned the house that had sold the adulterated alcohol; no one was inside at the time. The alcohol caused 18 deaths in Axochiapan and 11 others in nearby municipalities. The state office of DIF sent food and water to vulnerable groups of people in eight municipalities including Axochiapan on May 26.

== Communities ==
Axochiapan is the municipal seat. It has a population of 19,085 and an altitude of 1,033 meters (3,389 feet) above sea level. There are 26 schools: eight preschools, eight elementary schools (grades 1–6), two middle schools (grades 7–9), two public and four private high schools (grades 10–12), one special education school, and one school for adult education. It is 108 km (67 mi) from Cuernavaca and 157 km (98 mi) from Mexico City.

Telixtac has a population of 5,534 and an altitude of 1,095 meters. There is a preschool, two elementary schools, and a middle school. It is 8 km from Axochiapan.

Atlacahualoya has a population of 3,818 and an altitude of 1,039 meters above sea level. There is a preschool, an elementary school, and a middle school. It is 7 km from Axochiapan.

Quebrantadero has a population of 2,462 and an altitude of 1,069 meters. There is a preschool, an elementary school, and a middle school. It is 5 km from Axochiapan.

Marcelino Rodriguez (San Ignacio) has a population of 2,223 and an altitude of 1,100 meters above sea level. There is a preschool, an elementary school, a middle school, and a high school. It is 10 km from Axochiapan.

Tlalayo has a population of 807 and an altitude of 999 meters. There is a preschool, an elementary school, and a middle school. It is 6 km from Axochiapan.

== Connections to the Mexican Revolution ==
Axochiapan was not untouched during the Mexican Revolution. Members from the Liberation Army of the South such as Alejandro Casales, Joaquín Caamaño, Marcelino Rodríguez, Marcelino Vergara, Benigno Abundes, and José Palma had connections to the city.

General Alejandro Casales was one of the most important leaders during the Mexican Revolution. He fought in rebel operations in Morelos and helped organize peasant resistance. On March 11, 1911, peasants in Morelos took up arms in Ayala. Directed by Pablo Torres Burgos, they headed south to take Tlalquiltenango and Jojutla. When Burgos failed to control his men, he resigned from their command. After he left, he was captured and executed by his enemies. This left Casales to organize the soldiers. Soon, forces under the command of Morelos Cuernavaca and the 18th regiment under the control of Colonel Javier Rojas began to search for Casales. It wasn't long before the 18th Regiment found Casales. He fought heroically all day until he was finally caught and burned alive. However, he had left Axochiapan organized to be the background for a new municipality.

General José Palma was born in Axochiapan; in 1911 he joined the Zapatista movement. He fell in battle, and his body was never found.

General Marcelino Rodríguez was from San Pablo Hidalgo in Tlaltizapán. He acted with military forces inside the borders of Morelos. He was an officer under the orders of General Francisco Mendoza, acting as the head of his escorts and later as the colonel of his own guerrilla group.

General Benigno Abundes was from Axochiapan. He fought under the orders of General Lorenzo Vázquez. On August 30, 1911, when Emiliano Zapata broke with the group, Abundes took control of his troops. He continued battling in Tilzapotla, Los Hornos, Nexpa, Quetzalpa, Chaucingo. and San Miguel in the state of Guerrero.

Joaquín Camaño Pérez was born in Axochiapan in 1887. Joaquín was the son of Martín Camaño and Petra García Sánchez. He began fighting at a very young age because he was angered by injustice. His scope included Jonacatepec to Chietla in the state of Puebla. He united with General Francisco Mendoza's forces and was in the contingent that accompanied the General Emiliano Zapata in Chinameca where he was assassinated.

== Important dates ==
- 1542: Fray Juan de Alameda, in the name of King Carlos V, founds the town and calls it San Pablo de Axochiapan.
- 1869: Axochiapan integrates with the municipality of Santo Tomás of Tetelilla.
- 1887: Axochiapan becomes an independent municipality with Don Luis G. Rebolledo as the president.
- 1996: Axochiapan celebrated its 450th anniversary since its founding of in Tlahuican culture.
- 1997: Axochiapan celebrates its centennial as a municipality.

== Geography ==
=== Location ===
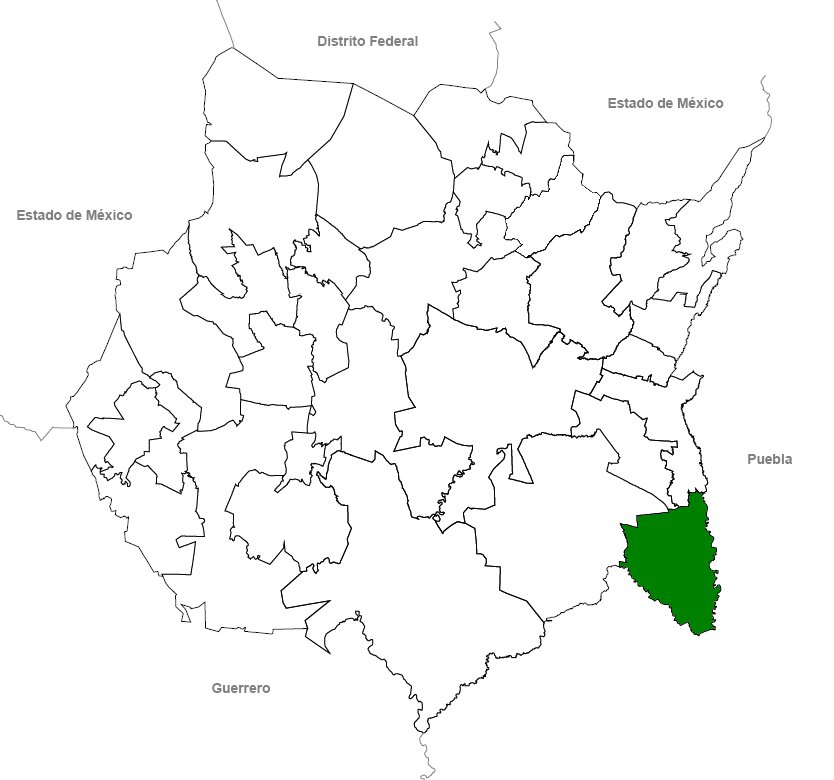
Axochiapan en Morelos

Axochiapan is located in southeastern Morelos at 18°30’ N and 98°45’ W at an altitude of 1,030 meters (3,380 feet) above sea level. It is bordered on the north with the municipality of Jonacatepec, to the south and east with the state of Puebla, and to the east with the municipality of Tepalcingo.

=== Area ===
The municipality has an area of 172.9 km^{2} (66.8 sq mi), representing 2.9% of the state's total. 1,093 hectares (2,700 acres) are used for farming and 780 hectares (1,900 acres) are used for ranching.

=== Topography ===
Axochiapan is located in a valley crossed by ravines. Its ground is hard to work with, and its geologic structure is that of large sediments, conglomerate rocks, and sands of various grades. The area is hilly near the southeast end of town, and those hills make up approximately 12.2% of the city. Axochiapan is mostly flat in its other areas.

=== Hydrography ===
The city's main water resources are mainly made up of the Amatzinac River and the Tenango River which cross the city. There are the gullies named Tochatlaco, Los Ahuhuetes, and El Pajarito. The Carros and Cayehuacan dams allow the city to use the water from the San Francisco River Tributary from the Nexpa River, which benefits more than 1,000 families, supports 45 deep wells, and is also used for agriculture.

=== Climate ===
The average annual temperature is 22 to 24 °C (72 to 75 °F), with rainfall that barely reaches 1,000 mm^{2} (39@) per year covering the months of June to September. Winds run from north to south.

=== Flora and fauna ===
Vegetation is primarily low deciduous forest: amate (a fig tree that grows to 75 feet tall), cubata (an acacia that grows to 25 feet tall), mesquite, peanuts, ceibas (a spiny tree that grows to 25 feet), cuatecomates (a tree with yellow or purple fruit), guajes (a legume), plum, guamuchil (a tree with red fruit), tepehuaje (a small tree), among others.

We can find mammals such as coyote, opossum, skunk, fox, squirrel, ferret, armadillo, and rabbit. There are reptiles such as the iguana and turtles; and amphibians, such as frogs. Birds include sparrow, buzzard, pigeon, magpies, quail, herons, and chachalacas. Fish include catfish, mojarra, and carp.

=== Natural resources ===
There are large deposits of different types of sand, ideal for making plaster. Mining is an important industry in the area.

== See also ==
- Encyclopedia of municipalities (Spanish)
- Governors of Morelos
- Morelos
- List of people from Morelos
