= Jonacatepec =

City in Morelos, Mexico

Coordinates: 18°41′N 98°48′W

- Municipality
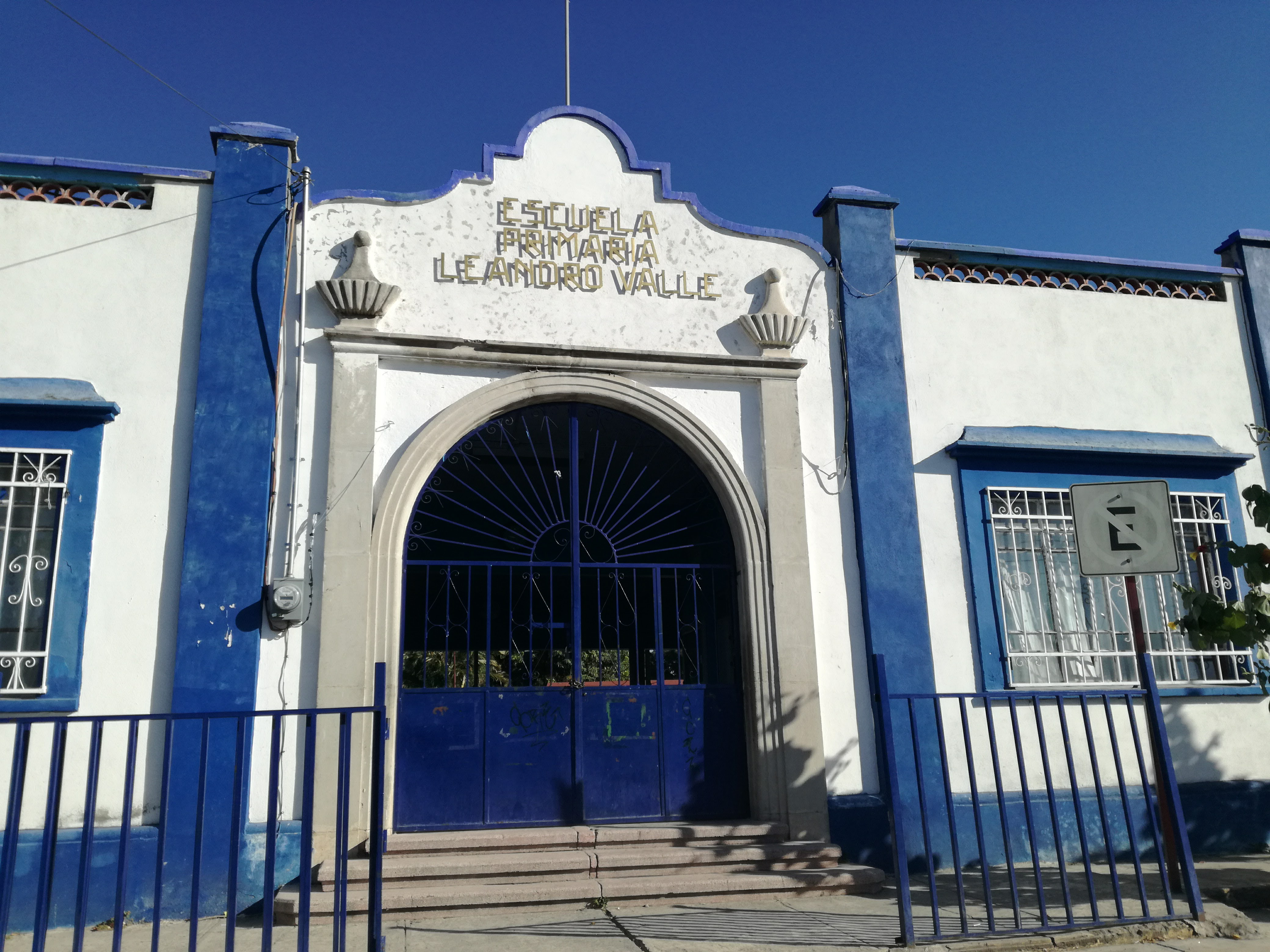

- Location in Mexico Jonacatepec (Mexico)
- Country: Mexico
- State: Morelos

Population (2020)
  - Municipality: 16,694
- Demonym: (in Spanish)
- Time zone: UTC−6 (CST)

Jonacatepec de Leondro Valle is a city in the Mexican state of Morelos. The city serves as the municipal seat for the surrounding municipality of the same name. The municipality reported 15,690 inhabitants in the year 2015 census.

The name Jonacatepec comes from Nahuatl language and was written Xonakatepek . Its etymological roots come from Xonaka-tl (onion), Tepe-tl (hill), k apócope from the adverb ko (place) and means "on the hill where there are onions". Leondro Valle is in reference to a supporter of the Plan de Ayutla of 1857 which opposed the dictatorship of Antonio López de Santa Anna. Leondro Valle was from the town of Jonacatepec.

Jonacatepec has 98 km^{2} (38 sq. miles), which represents 1.97% of the total area of the state. It is 1,290 meters (3,967 feet) above sea level.

== History ==
=== Prehispanic Era ===
During the Prehispanic era, the first settlers of Morelos were the Olmec (1500-900 BCE), subject to Chalcatzingo who flourished in the Archaic period (700-500 BCE). After their decline, the Toltec predominated, with ruins in Las Pilas, which flourished from 500-650 CE. According to anthropologist Hortensia de Vega, the springs surrounding the site were the most important element for the establishment and development of the population. The explorations have uncovered a complex network of channels, unique in its kind. The water directed towards large deposits was stored to be used in dry times and distributed to crop fields that were far away from the springs. In this way, agricultural production was increased, so that they could trade surpluses and obtain the objects that they needed for the ceremonies of their religious cult and the offerings to their dead. The water was stored to be used in dry times and distributed to fields that were far away from the springs so agricultural production was increased, enabling them to trade their surpluses and obtain the objects that they needed for the ceremonies of their religious cult and the offerings to their dead. The importance of this cult is evidenced by the presence of several burials found in the canals; as far as we know it is the first time that irrigation channels were used as tombs.

Later Nahuas including the Chichimeca and Tlahuica emigrated to the area (1100-1521). Xonakatepek (Jonacatepec) was subservient to Huaxtepec. Oaxtepec, which itself was tributary to Tenochtitlan.

=== Colonial Era ===
In the year 1558, the temple and convent of the town of Jonacatepec were founded, dedicated to St. Augustíne of Hippo. Its founders were Fray Jerónimo de San Esteban and Juan Cruzate, who are buried under the altar of this church. The main feature of this property is the size; this is the largest atrium in Morelos. The cloister of this convent is well-preserved.

In 1646 the province of Mexico was called "audience of Mexico", subservient to Cuautla de Ampillas, until the year 1824. The neighborhood of "San Francisco", the most populated; of its chapel there is no record of its construction, although it is believed it dates from 1774.

Due to the high population density, at least eight trapiches (sugar mills) were located in the east of Morelos, taking advantage of the water of the Amacuzac River. Two haciendas, Santa Clara de Montefalco in Jonacatepec and Santa Ana Tenangoin Jantetelco, gradually dominated the villages of Tlanahuac-Chalcatzingo.

The beginnings of Santa Clara de Montefalco date back to 1616. Pedro Cortés, a grandson of the Conqueror Hernán Cortés, rented the land (almost 86 hectares) and a ranch (about 780 hectares) to Pedro Aragón in 1616. Over the years, even during the Mexican Revolution, the hacienda stayed in the same family until it was sold to Opus Dei in 1952.

The hacienda of Santa Ana Tenango has its origin in part from a grant in 1589 by the viceroy Márquez de Villa Manrique, to its first owner, Luis Rebolledo. He established the first sugar mill around 1640 and later passed it to his son Francisco de Rebolledo, who in turn sold the farm in 1650 to Pedro Sáenz de Rosas. Pedro Segura settled in Jonacatepec and tried to improve the lives of the few inhabitants. Martín de la Rosa, a relative of Pedro Trápaga de Rosas, is credited with the construction of the bridge of the deep ravine, as well as the donation of the image of the Lord of the Three Falls to the chapel of the San Martín neighborhood, and of the Virgen de la Soledad to the chapel of San Francisco.

During all this time, the sugar haciendas were able to become richer and more powerful.

=== Early Independent Period ===
After the independence of Mexico, in 1855, the Jonacatepec district was legally recognized. Six years later, in 1861, the people of the town refused to recognize the presidency of Benito Juarez, choosing Porfirio Diaz instead, with Feliciano Chavarría as Governor of Morelos. The rebels of Jonacatepec were defeated in battle by forces under the command of General Jose Fandiño; the rebels then fled to Tetela and Hueyapan. Rosario Aragón, principal author of the Plan of Jonacatepec, was apprehended in Villa del Valle, State of Mexico.

On October 17, 1861, the Legislature of the State of Mexico created the districts of Cuernavaca, Cuautla, Yautepec, Tetecala, and Jonacatepec. On November 14 of that same year, the head offices of the District were designated as villas, except for those that were already cities. On July 7, 1862, President Benito Juarez changed the name of the community to Jonactepec de Leandro Valle in honor of a fallen native of the town who had supported him. Morelos became a state in 1869.

The haciendas of Santa Clara and Tenango expanded during the Porfiriato (1877-1911) to produce quantities of sugar never reached before. Besides Santa Clara and Tenango, the haciendas of San Ignacio (now Marcelino Rodríguez), Cuatepec, and Atotonilco prospered. Jonacatepec also prospered, but the series of injustices and dispossessions committed against the people at this stage caused yearning for the Mexican Revolution. Eventually, the liberal Club Leandro Valle was formed in Jonacatepec in opposition to the re-election of Governor of Morelos Pablo Escandón (1909-1911) and all he represented.

=== Revolution & 20th Century ===
Following the success of the Plan of Agua Prieta in 1920, General Francisco Mendoza was put in charge of eastern Morelos with a base in Jonacatepec.

Governor of Morelos Antonio Riva Palacio and his attorney general, Tomás Flores Allende, were nearly lynched in Jonacatepec after the police attacked several of the townspeople on August 5, 1993. The citizens were repressed by Grupo Scorpion under the command of Colonel Jorge Encinas Gutiérrz.

=== 21st Century ===
Although Jonacatec did not report the loss of lives, the municipality was severely damaged in the 2017 Puebla earthquake. At least 700 homes were destroyed, and many others were damaged.

Israel Andrade Zavala of Juntos por Morelos PRD-PSD was elected Presidente Municipal (mayor) in the election of July 1, 2018.

While the state of Morelos reported 209 cases and 28 deaths due to the COVID-19 pandemic in Mexico, as of April 27, 2020, no cases were reported in Jonacatepec. Schools and many businesses were closed from mid March until June 1. Sixty-nine cases were reported on December 27, 2020. Vaccinations for senior citizens (60+) are scheduled to begin on March 12, 2021.

== Communities ==
The municipality reported 15,690 inhabitants in the year 2015 census. The largest communities in the municipality of Jonacatepec are: Jonacatepec de Valle, the municipal seat, which is located 97–119 km (depending on the route used) east of Cuernavaca, 132 km south of Mexico City, and 87 km southwest of Puebla. Amacuitlapilco is 1.5 km from Jonacatepec. It has a population of 1,873 inhabitants. It is considered an Indigenous community of Tlahuica descent. It is 1,359 meters above sea level. There are one preschool, two elementary schools, and one telesecundaria. In addition, there are two preschools that conduct classes in Indigenous languages. Tetelilla is 8 km from Jonacatepec and has a population of 3,182 inhabitants. It is 1,164 meters above sea level. There is one preschool, two elementary schools, and one middle school. Tlayca is 4 km from Jonacatepec and has 506 inhabitants. It is 1,357 meters above sea level. There is one preschool and one elementary school.

== Notable people ==
Leandro Valle (1833-1861) was born in Mexico City on February 27, 1833. He spent his childhood in the town of Jonacatepec with his father. In 1836 General Antonio López de Santa Anna fell prisoner in Tejas (Texas), so Leandro Valle grew up under signs that Santa Anna could not consolidate the nascent Republic. In 1844, at the age of 11, he entered the Military College, graduating at 14 as Second Lieutenant and then fought in the Mexican–American War (1846-1848). After the war, he joined the Liberal Party and supported the 1854 Plan de Ayutla, which led to the ouster of Santa Anna and the election of Juan Álvarez as President of Mexico in Cuernavaca. Valle participated in the Reform War (1857-1860) distinguishing himself in the battles of Guadalajara, Silao, and San Miguel Calpulalpan; he was promoted to general at the age of 26. The Liberals won the war, and Benito Juárez became president. When Liberal hero Melchor Ocampo was kidnapped and murdered in Hidalgo by conservative guerrillas June 1861, Juárez sent Santos Degollado to capture the aggressors. Santos was also killed, and Juarez sent Valle to finish the job; Valle was also captured, then shot in the back, and his body was hung from a tree on June 23, 1861.

Agustín Aragón León (1870-1954) was an educator and politician born in Jonacatepec. He was a promoter of the positivist ideology and was the founder and editor of the magazine Positiva.

== Attractions and culture ==
In June 2017 the town council headed by the mayor, Israel Andrade Zavala, developed the "Municipal Plan for Tourism Development of Jonacatepec de Leandro Valle, Morelos" according to the World Tourism Organization (UNWTO). The priorities are taking advantage of the town's historic center, the St. Augustine monastery, Las Pilas archaeological zone and water park, El Cristo del Mirador park, plus local cuisine. It is hoped that the town will be certified as a "Magical Town".

=== Las Pilas water park and Archaeological Site ===
Las Pilas is the name of both a small water park and the ancient ruins found there. Located in Jonacatepec, the rustic water park has swimming pools and offers guided tours of the archaeological site.

The ruins of Las Pilas date from a 1st-century BCE village, although the most visible ruins date from 500-650 CE. Las Pilas was probably subject to Chalcatzingo, an Olmec an important religious and commercial center of great importance at that time that is only 4 km away. It is very possible that this site was subject to Chalcatzingo since it was a religious and commercial center of great importance at the time. The ceremonial center of Las Pilas was integrated by square constructions, and there is a complex system of canals used for irrigation. Another of the functions of this religious center seems to have been related to the water deities, possibly Tlaloc, which would explain the human burials placed in a strange lotus position in or near the channels. The site's main chronology is Early Classic, from 200 to 600 CE.

=== Ex Convento de San Agustín ===
The monastery of St. Augustine of Hippo, was founded about 1557 by the Augustinians, and by 1571 it supervised nine other churches. It was in continuous use until the middle of the 19th century, by which time it used a home for the parish priest, police barracks, a school, and a theater, while the atrium was used as a cemetery, a market, and a soccer field.

The atrium of the monastery is very large, which indicates that the Indigenous population subject to the head of San Agustín Jonacatepec during the colonial period was considerable. The traditional Onion Fair is celebrated in the atrium today. There are several elaborate tombs attached to the church dating from the 19th century. Three of the tombs have distinctive Masonic markings, including fluted columns and an elongated pyramid. It is believed that Masonry arrived in Mexico towards the end of the 18th century.

There is evidence that the bell tower, south, and west sides of the building were all impacted by bullets at the time of the Mexican Revolution

There are two chapels inside the church, and the original wooden altarpieces, believed to be carved by one of the greatest artists of the viceroyalty, Higinio Lopez of Zacualpan de Amilpas, are well-preserved.

The feast of St. Augustine is celebrated on May 5, and the Onion Fair is the second or third Friday of December.

=== Ex Hacienda de Santa Clara Montefalco ===
In 1616 Pedro Cortés, grandson of Hernán Cortés, leased more than 860 hectares to Pedro de Aragón. Two years later he gave him a license to plant sugarcane and establish a sugar mill. In 1708 Pedro de Segura inherited part of the hacienda from Antonio de Arrigorrieta in 1708, and he bought the rest of it from Arrigorrieta's widow and daughter. 32 years later, his nephew, Juan Francisco de Urtaza, inherited the mill and modernized it, establishing the base of the sugar emporium in eastern Morelos. Jose Antonio de Zalvide Goitia from Armentia, in the Basque country, inherited the hacienda from Urtaza in 1759. During the Mexican Revolution, the hacienda was burned and only a few walls remained standing. In 1952, the owners sold the hulk to Opus Dei, the conservative Catholic religious organization, to perform social work. They founded a school in 1961 and currently teach basic and upper secondary levels. Closed to the public.

=== Fairs & Festivals ===
The principal fairs are the Fair of the Pabellón on the fourth Friday of Lent, the Fair of the Tamal on the fifth Friday of Lent, the Battle of Puebla on May 5 (a civic festival with a parade, bulls, and theatrical presentations), and the Fair of the Cebolla (onion) on the second or third Friday of December.

=== Dance & Music ===
The Tecuán presents a character with old clothes, mocking mask and hat, carrying a stuffed animal in a traditional dance. While there is no music identified with the municipality, Zeferino Torres Montiel wrote Corrido de Jonacatepec.

=== Food ===
Popular foods include green mole of pipianwith tamales of cenizas; red mole with turkey, cecina with cheese, cream and green sauce with guaje; goat barbecue kid meat and wild pigeons stewed in pipian or green sauce. There are also a wide variety of recipes based on onions.

== Geography ==
=== Location and area ===
Jonacatepec de Leandro Valle is located at 18.683° latitude and -98.803° longitude. Its elevation is 1,360 m (4,462 ft.) above sea level. It is located in the Eje Neovolcánico (Neovolcanic Axis). Jonacatepec is 75.9 km (47.2 miles) east of Cuernavaca and 126.2 km (78.4 miles) south of Mexico City.

To the north are the municipalities of Temoac and Jantetelco; to the south is Axochiapan; to the east Jantetelco, to the west are Ayala and Tepalcingo. Jonacatepec has an area of 90.3 km^{2} (34.9 sq. mi.), which represents 1.9% of the area of the state.

=== Relief and waterways ===
The topography within a radius of 3 kilometers (2 miles) from Jonacatepec de Leandro Valle has large variations in altitude, with a maximum change in altitude of 265 meters and an average altitude above sea level of 1,348 meters. In a radius of 16 kilometers (10 miles), there are very large variations of altitude (825 meters; 2,700 ft.). In a radius of 80 kilometers (50 miles), there are enormous variations of altitude (4,795 meters; 15,732 ft.).

The most important heights are El Cerro Tenango (1,500 m) in the east of the municipality, El Cerro Del Cuachi (790 m) and Cerro Colorado (600 m) in the west. Hilly areas cover 14% of the territory while 86% is a plain or valley.

Jonacatepec belongs to the Rio Balsas hydrographic region and is within the Atoyac River basin. The River Amatzinac begins near Amayuca, which later forms the River Tepalcingo.

=== Flora and fauna ===
The area within a 3-kilometer radius of Jonacatepec de Leandro Valle is covered with cropland (98%); within a radius of 16 kilometers of cultivated land (78%) and trees (13%), and within a radius of 80 kilometers of farmland (38%) and trees (37%).

Wild animals include skunk, coyote, cacomixtle, tlacuache, armadillo, badger, squirrel, iguana, rabbit, ferret, rattlesnake, eagle, sparrowhawk, magpie, lammergeyer, chachalaca, pigeon, pigeon, wasp, huitlacoche, woodpecker, zenzontle, owl, bat, and hare. Plants include guamúchil (which has a small, red fruit), mezquite, amates (ficus), cazahuate, acacia, and copal (traditionally used for incense).

=== Climate ===
In Jonacatepec de Leandro Valle, the rainy season is cloudy, while the dry season is partly cloudy and hot throughout the year. The rainy season lasts from about May 23 to October 11; July is the wettest month and December is the driest. During the course of the year, the temperature generally varies from 11°C to 32°C and rarely drops below 8°C or rises above 35°C. The warmest temperatures occur from late March to late May, while the coolest temperatures are from late November to the end of January.

The skies are generally clear from October 31 to May 20; February 24 is the clearest day, while September 15 is the cloudiest day. Prevailing winds flow from the south from February through June and from the east from June through February. Wind velocity averages 8.7 km/h from December through May and 7.4 km/h from May through December.

=== Natural resources and soil use ===
There are lime mines on the Del Cuachi hill and Kaolinite mines on the Colorado hill. Jonacatepec has very fertile soils. 2,055 hectares (5,078 acres) are devoted to forestry.

== See also ==
- List of people from Morelos
