= Puente de Ixtla =

- City and municipality
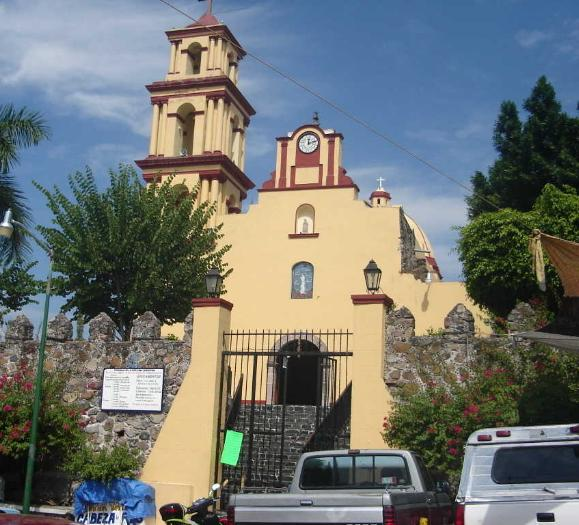
- Una iglesia en Puente de Ixtla, Morelos

- Location in Morelos Puente de Ixtla (Mexico)
- Coordinates: 18°37′0″N 99°19′11″W
- Country: Mexico
- State: Morelos
- Elevation: 897 m (2,943 ft)

Population (2020)
  - Total: 20,434
- Time zone: UTC-6 (Central Standard Time)
- Postal code: 62660–62697

Puente de Ixtla is a city in the Mexican state of Morelos. It stands at 18°37′01″N 99°19′23″W. The city serves as the municipal seat for the surrounding municipality of the same name. The municipality reported 66,435 inhabitants in the year 2015 census.

The town gets its name from a 16th-century bridge (Puente) and Ixtla, which comes from Nahuatl its (obsidian) and tla (abundance), meaning "Place where obsidian abounds".

== History ==
Puente de Ixtla belonged to the seigniory of Cuauhnahuac and was thus tributary of the Aztecs. Prehispanic ruins have been found near the Church of San Mateo Apostol.

A stone bridge was constructed over the Rio Chalma and the village became a place of required passage for the caravans from Acapulco to Mexico City. Legend has it that members of the Jesuits secretly buried a treasure in a cave near the ranchería (English: settlement) of Cacahuananche in 1767, the year the religious order was expelled from Nueva España.

A strong earthquake on 7 April 1845, did considerable damage in Puente de Ixtla and may have been responsible for the flooding of the village of Tequesquitengo, Jojutla.

With the creation of the Morelos in 1869, Puente de Ixtla was one of the already existing municipalities. 12 July 1871: annexation of the villages of Xoxocotla, Tehuixtla and of the hacienda of San Jose Vista Hermosa; later, Xoxocotla was attached to the municipality of Jojutla. The town Xoxocotla is scheduled to become an independent municipality on 1 January 2019.

Between 1913 and 1914 the population of Puente de Ixtla was evacuated because of the Revolution. One of the marks of the revolution is missing in the belfry of the Church of San Mateo, which was collapsed by a cannonball.

On Monday, 26 April 1920, President Álvaro Obregón, traveling from Iguala, met Francisco Cossio Robelo from Cuernavaca in Puente de Ixtla. This essentially ended the Mexican Revolution in the south of Mexico. The Puente Chalma over the Chalma River along the Cuernavaca-Iguala tollway collapsed on 26 July 2014. Two cars fell into the river and three people were injured.

Morelos suffered significant damage in the September 7, 2017 earthquake, and seventy-four people were killed in the September 19 earthquake. 23,000 buildings were damaged in the state, including 293 homes destroyed and 816 damaged in Puente de Ixtla.

Mario Ocampo Ocampo of Juntos Haremos Historia (Together we will make history coalition) was elected Presidente Municipal (mayor) in the election of 1 July 2018. When City Hall failed to pay MXN $1,3000,000 (US$66,540) to a disabled police officer in September 2019, an administrative court judge (Tribunal de Justicia Administrativa) ordered the mayor, trustee, and councilors to all step down for three years.

The state of Morelos reported 209 cases and 28 deaths due to the COVID-19 pandemic in Mexico as of 27 April 2020; four cases were reported in Puente de Ixtla. Schools and many businesses were closed from mid March until 1 June. On 2 June, Puente de Ixtla reported 74 confirmed cases and 13 deaths from the virus; the reopening of the state was pushed back until at least 13 June. One hundred seventy-five cases were reported on 27 December 2020. On 24 February Puente de Ixtla became the second municipality (after Temixco) in Morelos to vaccinate senior citizens (60+).

The Brigada Nacional de Búsqueda (National Search Brigade), composed of relatives of missing persons, found human remains along the Cuernavaca-Iguala tollway in Puente de Ixtla in July 2020 while on its first excursion into Morelos. The municipality has been under the scourge of several violent gangs, and many people are afraid of reporting them to the police.

== Points of Interest ==
- Puente de Mampostería 16th-century (Masonry bridge). The town gets its name from this bridge built to accommodate trade along the Acapulco-Mexico City route.
- Clock tower of the church Purísima Concepción. The church has a fiesta on 8 December.
- Church of San Mateo Ixtla. There are archaeological ruins next to the church. The feast is 21 September.
- Church of Xoxocotla, Morelos. The town became an independent municipality on 1 January 2019.
- Apotla waterpark in Xoxocotla. Swimming pool, water slide, waterfall, bat cave, campground, adventure activities, grills.
- Deportivo Casa de Campo sports center in Puente de Ixtla. Olympic pool, wading pool, campground; basketball & volleyball courts, soccer field.
- Los Amates waterpark next to Rio Tendeme in San Miguel Hidalgo, Puente de Ixtla. Pools, playground, hanging bridge, green areas, campground, cabins, fast football, volleyball & basketball courts. There is a 200-meter zip line and a small zoo that offers pony and dromedary rides.

=== Hacienda de San José Vista Hermosa ===
This 16th-century hacienda founded by Hernán Cortés is now a luxury restaurant/hotel with 105 rooms.

Established in the 16th century, the hacienda was sold by Pedro Cortés Ramírez de Arellano, grandson of the conqueror, in 1621, to Fray de Dios Guerrero. In the early 18th century, the hacienda was sold to Gabriel Yermo who in 1820 sold it to Manuel Vicente Vidal, being owned by this family until 1910, when the Mexican Revolution broke out. Emiliano Zapata took over the hacienda, burned alcohol, and distributed sugar among the peasants. The hacienda was restored and the hotel opened in 1945.

Villagers and local authorities in Tequesquitengo, Jojutla claim that the village was flooded by the Mosso brothers, who – according to Alfonso Toussaint – owned the San José Vista Hermosa hacienda in the mid-19th century (Mentz, et al., Haciendas de Morelos, Instituto de Cultura de Morelos, National Council for Culture and the Arts, Mexico, 1997), forming Lake Tequesquitengo.

=== Sierra de Huautla ===
Established in 2006, the Sierra de Huautla Biosphere Reserve (REBIOSH) covers 59,031 hectares (145,870 acres) in the Balsas River Basin of the municipalities of Puente de Ixtla, Tlaquiltenango, Amacuzac, Tepalcingo, Jojutla. Its rough topology varies from 700 to 2,240 meters (2,300 to 7,350 ft) above sea level in the Balsas Basin and constitutes a rich reservoir of endemic species to Mexico. There is a broad range of ecosystem, including low deciduous forest, gallery vegetation, and pine and oak forests. 939 species of plants, 44 species of butterflies, 71 species of mammals, 208 species of birds, 53 species of reptiles, 18 species of amphibians, and 14 species of fish have been noted. Among the species of animals are jaguars, short-horned Baronia butterfly, beaded lizard, military macaw, roufus-backed robin, Balsas screech owl, Pileated flycatcher, mountain lion, ocelot, margay, bobcat, and jaguarundi.

== See also ==
- List of people from Morelos
