= Amacuzac =

- Municipal and rural
- Location in Mexico
- Country: Mexico
- State: Morelos
- Municipality: May 13, 1868

Government
  - President: Ramiro Iturbe Parra (Note: Alfonso Miranda Gallegos won the July 2018 election by 2,500 votes but never took office because he was arrested on charges of murder and organized crime. Miranda Gallegos was scheduled to take office on January 1, 2019 but never took the oath office. Being locked in prison did not stop him from acting as mayor, working by telephone. Ramiro Iturbe Parra took the oath of office as interim president on October 2, 2019.)

Area
  - Total: 125 km^{2} (48 sq mi)
- Elevation: 900 m (3,000 ft)

Population (2020)
  - Total: 17,598
- Time zone: UTC-6 (Central Time)
- Postal code: 62640-62654
- Area code: 751

Amacuzac is a city in the Mexican state of Morelos. The name means In the River of Yellow Amates. Amacuzac stands at 18°36′N 99°23′W, at a mean height of 900 meters (3,000 feet) above sea level. The city serves as the municipal seat for the surrounding municipality of the same name. The municipality reported 17,772 inhabitants in the year 2015 census and covers a total surface area of 125 km^{2} (48 sq mi). The 2020 census reported 17,598 inhabitants in the municipality and 5,575 in the city of Amacuzac.

== History ==
The ancestors of the people of Amacuzac demonstrate Olmec influence. Small beads, vessels, human figurines, ceremonial whistles, and stone carvings have been dated to the years 900 to 500 BCE, coinciding with the peak of La Venta in Tabasco.

During the Colonial era, Amacuzac belonged to the Marquessate of the Valley of Oaxaca. Martin Cortés built the Hacienda de San Gabriel, and in 1554 he ceded land to build a church along the highway to Acapulco. The church, which took three hundred years to build, was founded by Franciscans and was called San Gabriel Yermo in honor of Gabriel J. de Yermo. Between the 16th and 18th centuries, Amacuzac lost a great deal of its territory to the hacienda of San Gabriel.

General Agustín de Iturbide maintained his headquarters in San Gabriel Amacuzac during the Mexican War of Independence. He met with General Vicente Guerrero at the hacienda before agreeing to the Plan of Iguala that ended the war in 1821.

The town of Amacuzac was nearly wiped out in 1850 due to cholera. The ruins of this town can be found one kilometer south of the present town, which was founded by Aniceto Aranda in 1853. The town was rebuilt largely due to the efforts of Aranda. By 1884, several families from Teacalco and Contlalco had settled there, and in 1890 the people of Amacuzac built a chalana (barge) to transport merchandise from Acapulco.

In 1891 Amacuzac was the scene of a conference between representatives of the states of Morelos and Guerrero to establish the border. As a result, the border was established in the Serranía de Ocotlán, which was signed into law on April 30, 1892, ratified by President Álvaro Obregón on May 23, 1923. Dissatisfied with the religious beliefs of the village of San Gabriel, President Plutarco Elías Calles seized land belonging to this village and granted it to Las Palmas, creating San Gabriel Las Palmas.

Alfonso Miranda Gallegos, the candidate of Juntos Haremos Historia (Together we will make history coalition), was elected municipal president in the election of July 1, 2018, with 57% of the votes. Despite his 2,500 vote victory, he was never certified as the winner because he had been arrested for organized crime and murder six weeks earlier (he is the uncle of a leader of Los Rojos drug cartel). Ramiro Iturbe Parra was sworn in as interim mayor on October 2, 2019.

While the state of Morelos reported 209 cases and 28 deaths due to the COVID-19 pandemic in Mexico, as of April 27, 2020, no cases were reported in Amacuzac. Schools and many businesses were closed from mid March until June 1. On June 2, Amacuzac reported five confirmed cases and the reopening of the state was pushed back until at least June 13. Amacuzac reported 19 cases, 16 recuperations, and one death as of August 31. Forty-seven cases were reported on December 27, 2020.

=== Notable people ===
- Martín Cortés, 2nd Marquess of the Valley of Oaxaca (1532–1589), donated land to build the church od St Gabriel
- Gabriel J. de Yermo (1757–1813), landowner and royalist
- Agustín Cosme Damián de Iturbide y Arámburu (1783–1824)and Vicente Ramón Guerrero Saldaña (1782–1831), generals who negotiated the end of the Mexican War of Independence at San Gabriel Yermo hacienda.
- Aniceto Aranda, founder of Amacuzac after the cholera epidemic of 1851.

Municipal presidents, 1921–present

- Crescencio Jaime Aranda, 1921
- Alberto Iturbe Valdos, 1922–1926
- Aurelio Ocampo Ortíz, 1931–1932
- Manuel Aranda Melgar, 1920–1929
- Julio Iturbe Ocampo, 1927–1928
- Manuel Aranda Melgar, 1930
- Silvano Iturbe Ocampo, 1925–1933, 1934
- Agustín Aranda Melgar, 1937–1938
- Alberto Iturbe Valdos, 1939–1940
- Rafael Ocampo Ortíz, 1941–1942
- Baldomero Suárez Sotelo, 1943–1944
- Manuel J. Barón, 1945–1946
- Isaac Iturbe Pastrana, 1947–1948
- Juan Jaime Silva, 1950
- Rubén Uribe Ajá, 1953–1954
- Juan Rodríguez Miranda, 1956–1957
- Aurelio Ocampo Ortíz, 1958–1960
- Agustín Brito Aranda, 1961–1963
- Ángel Ortíz Torralba, 1964–1966
- Rubén Uribe Ajá, 1970–1973
- Francisco Trujillo Guadarrama, 1973–1976
- Carlos Domínguez Zavala, 1977–1979
- Jesús Jaime Millán, 1976
- Eulalio Espíndola Aranda, 1979–1982
- Antonio Salazar Jaime, 1982–1985
- Antonio Espíndola Aranda, 1985–1988
- Roberto Brito Aranda, 1988-1991 (PRI)
- Agustín Aranda Fernández, 1991-1994 (PRI)
- Eulalio Espíndola Aranda, 1994-1997 (PRI-PVEM)
- Onésimo Acosta Salgado, 1997-2000 (Coalition)
- Andrés García Jaime, 2000-2003 (PRI)
- Alberto Luna Villegas, 2003-2006 (PT)
- Pablo Fernandez Nava, 2006-2009 (ND)
- Alfonso Miranda Gallegos, 2009-2012 (PT)
- Noe Reynoso Nava, 2012-2015 (PVEM)
- Jorge Miranda Abarca, 2015-2018 (PRI-PVEM-PNA)
- vacant 2019 (Note: Alfonso Miranda Gallegos was elected in July 2018 but was not able to take office because he was in prison.)
- Ramiro Iturbe Parra, October 2, 2019 – present

== Geography ==
=== Orography ===
The southern part of the municipality, some 59% of the total area, is flat. The Sierra de Ocotlán (or Cerro Frío) is on the southern border; its main heights are: Cerro del Veladero, el Sombrerito, and el Picacho at 1,250 meters (4,100 feet) each. North of Teacalco is the Cerro de los Ajonjolíes and the Cerro de los Corrales at 1,259 meters (4,131 feet).

=== Hydrography ===
Water resources of Amacuzac consist basically of the Rio Salado, which passes through Casahuatlán and Coahuixtla. The Amacuzac River runs along part of the border of the municipality, fed by the stream from the Barranca de Xoapa, which has its source in the municipality of Tetecala. The Amacuzac River begins in the town of Cacahuamilpa, Guerrero, at the junction of Río Chontacoatlán and Río San Jerónimo. The river is approximately 80 kilometres (50 miles) long. After leaving the municipality of Amacuzac, the river goes to Puente de Ixtla by Río Chalma and Río Tembembe, joining other rivers to feed Río Mezcala and form the Balsas River. There is an important dam in Amacuzac at Rancho Nuevo. The dam has a capacity of 2,000,000 cubic metres (2,000,000 m^{3}).

=== Climate ===
The municipality of Amacuzac has a humid tropical climate, with an annual average temperature of 25 °C (77 °F), a rainfall of 1,187 millimetres (46.7 inches) per year, and its rainy season is from June to October.

=== Flora and Fauna ===
Vegetation includes cazahuate (a tree that measures 15 to 50 feet high and has long leaves and white flowers ), ceiba, cuajilote (a thorny tree), tepehuaje (a tree that measures between 25 and 40 feet), chapulixtle (a medicinal plant), mesquite, parota, red and white huaje (a legume), nopal (prickly pear), Guamúchil (a medium-sized fruit tree), copal (traditionally used for incense), and huizache (acacia).

Animals include badger, white-tailed deer, hare, common rabbit, coyote, weasel, cacomixtle (similar to a raccoon), opossum, foxes, skunks, armadillo, raccoon, ferret, cuinique (chipmunk), bats, flagged bird, chachalaca, magpie, buzzard, aura, raven, and owl. Many of these species are in danger of extinction.

==== Sierra de Huautla ====
Established in 2006, the Sierra de Huautla Biosphere Reserve (REBIOSH) covers 59,031 hectares (145,870 acres) in the Balsas River Basin of the municipalities of Amacuzac, Tlaquiltenango, Tepalcingo, Jojutla, and Puente de Ixtla. Its rough topology varies from 700 to 2,240 meters (2,300 to 7,350 ft) above sea level in the Balsas Basin and constitutes a rich reservoir of endemic species to Mexico. There is a broad range of ecosystem, including low deciduous forest, gallery vegetation, and pine and oak forests. 939 species of plants, 44 species of butterflies, 71 species of mammals, 208 species of birds, 53 species of reptiles, 18 species of amphibians, and 14 species of fish have been noted. Among the species of animals are jaguars, short-horned Baronia butterfly, beaded lizard, military macaw, roufus-backed robin, Balsas screech owl, Pileated flycatcher, mountain lion, ocelot, margay, bobcat, and jaguarundi.

=== Natural resources ===
There are small quarries of sand and stone quarry, whose exploitation is carried out by the inhabitants of the community and are intended for self-consumption within the municipality. In the area of construction, there is a deposit of raw material for the production of cement. The river is also a source of gravel-sand production for construction.

== Monuments and museums ==
=== La Hacienda de San Gabriel Las Palmas ===
The monastery was built upon the orders of Hernán Cortés in 1529. When the Franciscans were forced to abandon their monastery in 1558, San Gabriel was converted to a sugar cane plantation, eventually becoming the largest important refinery in Mexico. The Hacienda was also an important rest point for travelers along the Acapulco-Mexico City trail. During the Mexican War of Independence, insurgent Leonardo Bravo was betrayed and captured at the hacienda of San Gabriel; he was later executed in Mexico City. Later, in 1821, the hacienda was the scenario of a plot between Vicente Guerrero and Agustín de Iturbide to make the latter emperor of Mexico. During the Porfiriato, while he was at the Hacienda of San Gabriel, President Porfirio Diaz ordered the execution of Andres Molina Enriquez, a leading advocate of land reform. During the Mexican Revolution, the hacienda served as a headquarters for Emiliano Zapata. Today the ex-hacienda is a hotel/restaurant/spa/museum. Visitors can also see the historical watchtower and jail.

=== Zoofari ===
Zoofari is a Safari park in Teacalco featuring 130 different species and over 1,500 animals. Founded in May, 1984, the park is based on respect for nature, generating awareness of protection to life, to promote empathy, love, and learning the wonderful animal world and the environment. The park is divided into six sections, five for you to travel by car and admire life closely. The park has a zip line, restaurant, and gift shop. In July, 2018, the Federal Attorney for Environmental Protection sent five Centrochelys sulcata turtles to Zoofari for safekeeping.

=== Other ===
The Church of San Gabriel Las Palmas in Amacuzac and the Church of Huajintlán were founded by Franciscans and Jesuits in the 16th century. The feast of San Gabriel (St. Gabriel) is celebrated from March 24 to March 30. St. Francis of Assisi is celebrated in Huajintlán from September 29 to October 5, and the Virgin of Guadalupe is honored in Teacalco from December 12 to 18. Festivals are accompanied by a brass band and Chinelo dancers.

There are natural beaches along the Amacuzac River in Huajintlán and in the town of Amacuzac, and along the Temembe River near San Gabriel de las Palmas. There is a small water park called San Juan II in San Gabriel de las Palmas.

Handicrafts include güiros, tambourines, and maracas (percussion instruments). Traditional foods include iguana stew, rabbit stew, red and green mole, and tamarind. The largest artesenal Mezcal distillery in Mexico is Casa Resiu Mezcal, located in Santa Teresa.

== Principal communities ==
Amacuzac is the municipal seat. Its principal economic activities are agriculture and commerce. It has 5,575 residents and is 47.8 kilometres (29.7 mi) from Cuernavaca via Mexican Federal Highway 95D or Mexican Federal Highway 95 and 136 km (85 mi) from Mexico City. There are three preschools, three elementary schools (grades1-6), a middle school (grades 7–9), and a high school (grades 10–12). It is 899 meters (2,949 feet) above sea level.

San Gabriel las Palmas has 2,955 residents. Its principal economic activity is agriculture. It is 44 kilometres (27 mi) from Cuernavaca and 4.3 kilometres (2.7 mi) from the municipal seat. There is one preschool, two elementary schools (grades 1–6), and a middle school (grades 7–9). It is located at an altitude of 915 metres (3,002 ft) above sea level.

Casahuatlán has 1,915 residents.

Huajintlán is a farming community with 1,788 residents located 49 kilometres (30 mi) from Cuernavaca and 7 kilometres (4.3 mi) from the municipal seat. It is 956 metres (3,136 ft) above sea level, and there is one preschool, two elementary schools, and one middle school.

Coahuixtla has 1,151 residents. Rancho Nuevo has 840 residents.

Teacalco is a farming community with 711 residents located 52 kilometres (32 mi) from Cuernavaca and 11 kilometres (6.8 mi) from the municipal seat. It is 991 metres (3,251 ft) above sea level, and there is a preschool, an elementary school, and a middle school.

Miahuatlán (El Cuiji) has 561 residents. Cajones has 553.

The principal crops grown in Amacuzac are sugar cane, sorghum, corn, beans, and peanuts. The principal vegetables are squash, cucumbers, tomatoes, and green tomatoes. Watermelons, mangos, guava, oranges, and lemons are also grown. River fishing and fish farms are also important sources of employment.

== See also ==
- Governors of Morelos
- Morelos
- List of people from Morelos
