= Tepalcingo =

Town in Morelos, Mexico

- Municipality
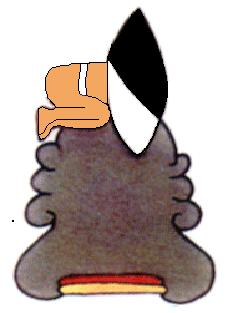
- Coat of arms

- Location in Mexico Tepalcingo (Mexico)
- Country: Mexico
- State: Morelos
- Demonym: (in Spanish)
- Time zone: UTC−6 (CST)

Tepalcingo is a town in the Mexican state of Morelos. It at 18°26′N 98°18′W. The name Nahuatl root tekpa-tl (flint), tzintli (saves honor), tzinco (back of an individual), so in sum it means tekpatzinko "down or behind the flints".

Tepalcingo limits to the north with Ayala and Jonacatepec; to the south with Tlaquiltenango and the State of Puebla; to the east with Axochiapan and Jonacatepec; to the west with Ayala and Tlaquiltenango. It is 1,160 meters (3,810 feet) above sea level.

The city serves as the municipal seat for the surrounding municipality, with which it shares a name. It reported 27,187 inhabitants in the 2015 census.

== History ==
=== Prehispanic History ===
It is believed that in 1272, Mixtec women, men, and children who broke away from Iloala (present-day Iguala Guerrero) founded the town of Tepalcingo. Ruins believed to belong to the Pueblo Viejo, located in the hills of Zopiloapan, west of modern Tepalcingo, have been found.

Tepalcingo was later conquered by the Aztecs in 1445, when it was subject to Huaxtepec (Oaxtepec).

=== Colonial History ===
After the Conquest of Mexico, Tepalcingo paid tribute directly to the Spanish crown until 1532 when it was incorporated in the lands of Hernán Cortés when it became subject to Yecapichtlan (Yecapixtla). Martín Cortés, son of the conquistador, faced an independence struggle of people who did not want to be subjects of the marquisate, and from 1565 Tepalcingo was included in what is called the Tlalnahuac, a group of fifteen towns south of Yecapixtla. Cortes gained possession of the lands in 1587, after which they passed to the Dukes of Terranova and then the Dukes of Monteleone. The inhabitants of the 15 villages of the Tlalnahuac were decimated by smallpox, plague, measles, and other diseases brought from Europe since they did not have defenses against so many new diseases. Thus the people of the Tlalnahuac could not organize a coordinated resistance, and for 350 years they were subjugated by the haciendas.

=== Independence and 19th Century ===
Vicente Guerrero abolished the marquisate in 1829; however, for many years, part of the hacienda properties would remain in the hands of descendants of Hernán and Martín Cortés. The people of Tepalcingo vainly petitioned for restitution of their lands in 1853.

Upon independence in 1821, the modern territory of Morelos was part of the State of Mexico. In 1869 the state of Morelos was founded, and Tepalcingo, including Huautla, became a municipality on June 14, 1872. A smallpox epidemic decimated the area between 1895 and 1910; between August 1903 and January 1904, 573 of 574 children in Tepelcingo died.

=== Revolution and 20th Century ===
Local residents Dionisio Gómez, Severiano Pérez, Claudio Pérez, Isabel X., Macedonio Coyote, Martín Barba, Epifanio Vázquez, Severiano Pariente, and Severiano Trejo died during the Mexican Revolution.

=== 21st Century ===
Although the epicenter of the September 19, 2017 earthquake was in Axochiapan, the municipality of Tepalcingo was among the most severely affected. Public, private, and religious buildings were seriously damaged; there was structural damage to the Sanctuary of Jesus of Nazareth, which nearly collapsed; all the other churches of the municipality were damaged as well as the municipal presidency, the market, and other buildings. Municipal President Alfredo Sánchez Vélez said that 700 homes could not be used, while others had cracks. No lives were reported lost. The Secretary of Health reported that 486 homes were destroyed and 2,263 were damaged, more than in any other municipality.

Alfredo Sánchez Velez of PVEM (Green Party) was elected Presidente Municipal (mayor) in the election of July 1, 2018. Violence is a major concern; 400 people tried to lynch four men suspected of kidnapping a child on January 22, 2019.

The state of Morelos reported 209 cases and 28 deaths due to the COVID-19 pandemic in Mexico as of April 27, 2020; two cases were reported in Tepalcingo. Schools and many businesses were closed from mid March until June 1. Ninety-five cases were reported in the municipality on December 27, 2020. Vaccinations for senior citizens (60+) are scheduled to begin on March 12, 2021.

Fifteen people died in Axochiapan, Jantetelco, and Tepalcingo due to adulterated alcohol on Mother's Day.

== Culture ==
The oldest fair in Morelos is held in Tepelcingo on the third Friday of Lent. Visitors come from all over Morelos and nearby states; they enjoy pulque, and traditional dances. Cattle and handicrafts, including boxes of Olinalá aromatic wood are sold. This is the fourth most important fair of Mexico and the largest popular fair in Mexico type Tiaquixtli.

There are three types of music: Tecuanes, Tlatenquiza, and Cañeros. Cuisine includes greenmole of pepita (pipián) with tamales of cenizas, red turkey mole, cecina with cheese, cream, and green sauce with guaje; barbecue of kid and wild pigeons stewed in pipián or in green sauce.

=== Sierra de Huautla ===
Established in 2006, the Sierra de Huautla Biosphere Reserve (REBIOSH) covers 59,031 hectares (145,870 acres) in the Balsas River Basin of the municipalities of Tlaquiltenango, Amacuzac, Tepalcingo, Jojutla, and Puente de Ixtla. Its rough topology varies from 700 to 2,240 meters (2,300 to 7,350 ft) above sea level in the Balsas Basin and constitutes a rich reservoir of endemic species to Mexico. There is a broad range of ecosystem, including low deciduous forest, gallery vegetation, and pine and oak forests. 939 species of plants, 44 species of butterflies, 71 species of mammals, 208 species of birds, 53 species of reptiles, 18 species of amphibians, and 14 species of fish have been noted. Among the species of animals are jaguars, short-horned Baronia butterfly, beaded lizard, military macaw, roufus-backed robin, Balsas screech owl, Pileated flycatcher, mountain lion, ocelot, margay, bobcat, and jaguarundi.

== Tourism ==
Tourism includes the Pre-Hispanic Pueblo Viejo, Las Termas thermal water park of Atotonilco, with 29 °C (84 °F) water and the Los Delfines water park. There is Ecotourism- in the Sierra de Huatla, the scenic view of the Cerrito Tepactzin, and the dam. The sanctuary of the Lord of Tepalcingo, the churches of Santa Mónica, Holy Cross, and Nuestra Señora de Guadalupe, and the parish of San Martín Obispo (feast November 11), as well as the Hacienda de San Nicolás Tolentino are also popular with tourists.

=== Shrine of the Lord of Tepalcingo ===
According to legend, in the 16th century, a girl found a small [30 centimeter tall] wooden figure in the river. The figure represented Jesus Christ tied by his arms to a column. A small hermitage was built where the figure was venerated. Over the years, the sculpture was moved, first to the chapel of Santa Cruz, and then to that of San Martín. In the 18th century, a craftsman from Puebla was commissioned to make a larger sculpture of the Patron Saint, but, unlike the Lord of the Column, he was asked to change the figure to Jesus of Nazareth with a cross. The figure was brought to Tepalcingo and the men who were carrying it said, "it became heavy". A church made of yellow stone from Chalcatcingo was built in that exact place.

Agustín Pila Dreinhofer, in the book Arquitectura Barroca (UNAM, 2013), highlights the Shrine of Tepalcingo as the best example of popular baroque in New Spain. The most striking aspect of this temple is its main façade or doorway, in pink - "a true theological treatise", according to Pila Dreinhofer -, with elements, twisted columns, animals, characters and scenes from the Old and New Testaments, from the Creation of the world until the Last Supper; made in stucco, similar to a technique used in pyramids and pre-Hispanic buildings.

== Communities ==
Tepalcingo is divided into 20 localities; the most important are: Tepalcingo (the municipal seat), Huitchila, Ixtlilco El Chico, Ixtlilco, Ixtlilco El Grande, Los Sauces, El Tepehuaje, El Limón, Pitzotlán, El Pastor, and Zacapalco.

== See also ==
- List of people from Morelos
