= Jantetelco =

City in Morelos, Mexico

Coordinates: 18°42′30″N 98°46′12″W

Jantetelco, officially Jantetelco de Matamoros, is a city in the Mexican state of Morelos. The city serves as the municipal seat for the surrounding municipality of the same name. The municipality reported 17,238 inhabitants in the year 2015 census.

The name Jantetelco comes from Nahuatl words meaning "hill of adobe buildings" and should be spelled Xamtetelko." Remains of adobe foundations have been found at the entrance to the town. A 59 cm high goddess of corn, Xochiketzal, and a circular 15 cm by 25 cm garland and the sign for Xóchitl ("flower") have been found behind the church. Matamoros refers to Padre Mariano Matamoros, hero of the Mexican War of Independence.

== History ==
During the prehispanic era, the area was part of Huaxtepec (Oaxtepec), and during the colonial era, it belonged to Cuautla de Amilpas. The village priest in 1811 was Mariano Matamoros, who joined José María Morelos in Izucar and during the Siege of Cuautla. On October 12, 1874, the town was renamed Jantetelco de Matamoros by Governor Francisco Leyva. In 1885 Matamoros's room was made a museum, called El Dormitorio.

While the September 7, 2017 earthquake caused little significant damage in Morelos, the Axochiapan earthquake twelve days later killed 74 people in Morelos and damaged nearly all the colonialera buildings. In Jantetelco, 281 homes were destroyed and 191 others were damaged.

Juan Felipe Dominguez Robles of Partido Humanista de Morelos (Humanistic Party of Morelos) was elected Presidente Municipal (mayor) in the election of July 1, 2018. On February 23, 2019, opponents of the construction of a thermoelectric plant in Huexca, Yecapixtla burned ballots that were slated to be used in a referendum on the proposed plant.

While the state of Morelos reported 209 cases and 28 deaths due to the COVID-19 pandemic in Mexico, as of April 27, 2020, no cases were reported in Jantetelco. Schools and many businesses were closed from mid March until June 1. Forty-one cases were reported in the municipality on December 27, 2020. Vaccinations for senior citizens (60+) are scheduled to begin on March 12, 2021.

Fifteen people died in Axochiapan, Jantetelco, and Tepalcingo due to adulterated alcohol on Mother's Day. The state office of DIF sent food and water to vulnerable groups of people in eight municipalities including Jantetelco on May 26.

== Communities ==
Jantetelco is the municipal seat and has a population of 4,645. It is located at 1,430 meters above sea level, 75.3 km from Cuernavaca, and 130.2 km from Mexico City. Its main economic activities are agriculture (sorghum, corn, beans) and ranching (cattle, goats, poultry, and pigs). Principal festivals are June 29, in honor of San Pedro Apóstol and December 13, the uprising of Father Mariano Matamoros.

Amayuca has a population of 5,287. Its main economic activities are agriculture (sorghum, corn, beans) and ranching (cattle, goats, poultry, and pigs). Clay pottery is produced. Santiago Apostle is honored on July 25. It is 2.1 km from Jantetelco.

Chalcatzingo has a population of 2,449. The community is Nahuatl in origin. It is mostly an agricultural community (sorghum, corn, beans) and livestock are raised. Tourism to the Chalcatzingo archaeological site and the sale of miniature cuescomates (traditional silos) are also important economic activities. San Mateo Evangelista is honored on September 21. It is 3.7 km from Jantetelco.

Tenango and Santa Ana have a population of 1,856. Their main economic activities are agriculture (sugarcane, sorghum, corn) and livestock. The former hacienda of Tenango is a cultural attraction. Santa Ana is honored on July 26.

San Antonio Esperanza is an agricultural (rice, sorghum, corn) and livestock raising (cattle, goats, poultry, and pigs) community. The feast of St. Anthony of Padua is June 13.

== Culture ==
The Dominican convent of San Pedro Apóstol was built in the 16th century. There are churches dedicated to St. Matthew, St. Francis, St. James the Greater (Apostol), and St. Clara. The ex-hacienda of Tenango is outside the town.

The archaeological zone of Chalcatzingo is nearby. This site belongs to the Preclassic Medium period, 1500-350 B.C. It is one of the most important settlements influenced by the Olmecs, along with Teopantecuanitlán. Chalcatzingo development paralleled that of La Venta, evidenced by its petrographs (stone carvings).

There is a fair in honor of St. Peter the Apostol on June 29, celebrated with bands and Chinelos (dancers). Traditional foods include beef cecina with fresh cream and pork cecina. A candy made of crystallized milk and peanuts is also made.

== Geography ==
=== Location, altitude, and area ===
Jantetelco is located 18°42'30" North and 98°46'12" West at a height of 1,160 meters (3,810 feet) above sea level. The municipality of Temoac is north, Axochiapan is south, Jonacatepec is west, and the State of Puebla is east. It is 68.2 km (42.4 mi) east of Cuernavaca, 130.2 (80.9 miles) south of Mexico City, and 80.1 km (49.8 mi) southwest of Puebla.

Jantetelco has an area of 102.1 km^{2} (39.4 sq mi), which represents 2.10% of the total state. It is divided politically in 10 locations.

=== Relief and waterways ===
Jantetelco is located between hills and ravines of sedimentary trawls. In the center of the municipality, the hills of Jantetelco reach an altitude of 1,878 meters (6,161 feet) and that of Chalcatzingo reaches 1,570 meters (5,150 feet). The rest of the territory consists of sedimentary plains.

This municipality is crossed by Amatzinac, Tenango, Los Santos, and Tepalcingo Rivers. Streams are plentiful.

=== Climate ===
The climate in Jantetelco is tropical. In winter, there is much less rainfall in Jantetelco than in summer. This location is classified as Aw by Köppen and Geiger. The temperature averages 22.5 °C (72.5 °F). Precipitation averages 865 mm (33.7").

=== Flora and Fauana ===
Vegetation in Jantetelco is mostly low deciduous forest of warm climate: Jacaranda, tabachín, casahuate, ceiba and bougainvillea. Animals include raccoon, badger, skunk, armadillo, hare, common rabbit, coyote, mountain lion, weasel, cacomixtle, opossum, bat, chachalaca, magpie, buzzard, crow, and owl.

=== Land use ===
There are 3,445 hectares (8,510 acres) for agricultural use, 5,383 hectares (13,300 acres) for livestock use, and 1,986 hectares (4,910 acres) for forestry use. 6,493 hectares (16,040 acres) are ejido property, 160 hectares (400 acres) communal property and 5,319 hectares (13,140 acres) private property.

== See also ==
- List of people from Morelos
- Chalcatzingo
