= Amacuzac River =

Coordinates: 17°52′52″N 99°9′22″W

Location
- Country: Mexico
- States: State of Mexico, Morelos, Guerrero

Physical characteristics
- Source
  - location: 18.943940N, -99.262800W
- Mouth
  - location: Balsas River, 39.288770N, -91.742280W
- Length: 60 km (37 mi)

The Amacuzac River is located in Morelos, Mexico and it is the most important river of this state being approximately 60 km long. It originates in the slopes of Nevado de Toluca and empties southwards into the Balsas River. It bisects the Sierra de Huautla, and a portion of the river is in the Sierra de Huautla Biosphere Reserve. The Amacuzac River is known for its rapids which support extreme sports.

== Geography ==
The Amacuzac River is one of the most important tributaries of the Balsas River. It originates on the slopes of the Nevado de Toluca, in the State of Mexico, where it is known as Texcatitlán River. The Amacuzac River runs through the valley of Almoloya de Alquisiras, after 75 km it reaches the Sierra de Cacahuamilpa, then it disappears at the foot of Jumil Hill and turns into an underground river.

When it emerges the current is known as the Amacuzac River, in the territory of the state of Morelos. The Cuautla River empties into the Amacuzac River and crosses the town of Amacuzac. It receives the flow of the Chiquito River which collects the waters of Tembembe and Chalma. Finally it reaches the place called Balseadero where it follows its route of about 104 km moving to the southwest, outside Morelos to join the Balsas River.

== Environment ==
The Amacuzac River is located in the tropical zone and It has a hydrological surface of 117,406 km^{2}, distributed in three sub-regions: High Balsas 50,409 km^{2}, Middle Balsas 31,951 km^{2}, and Lower Balsas 35,046 km^{2}. A total of 45 species, 32 genera and 10 families of aquatic and semiaquatic beetles live near the Amacuzac River. The climate that prevails near the river is the warm humid, mainly in the low part of Amacuzac River. The Amacuzac River is the main water body of the Sierra de Huautla Biosphere Reserve, and flows for over 60 km within the reserve.

== Activities ==
During the rainy season, the Amacuzac River swells enough to support some extreme sports such as rafting. The river is divided into two parts, high and low. The high part is approximately 15 kilometers long and it is quiet. The rivers are classified according to their degree of turbulence, from level I to VI, I being the calmest and VI the most dangerous. In the low part of the Amacuzac River the rapids can be category III or IV.

== See also ==
- List of rivers of Mexico
