= Morelos =

State of Mexico

- State
- Free and Sovereign State of Morelos; Estado Libre y Soberano de Morelos (Spanish)
- Coat of arms
- Motto(s): Tierra y Libertad ('Land and Liberty') (Coat of arms: La tierra volverá a quienes la trabajan con sus manos [The land will be returned to those who work it with their hands])
- Anthem: Marcha Morelense
- State of Morelos within Mexico
- Coordinates: 18°45′N 99°4′W
- Country: Mexico
- Capital and largest city: Cuernavaca
- Municipalities: 36
- Admission: 17 April 1869
- Order: 27th
- Named for: José María Morelos

Government
  - Governor: Margarita González Saravia (MORENA)
  - Senators: Lucía Virginia Meza Guzmán; Sergio Pérez Flores; Ángel García Yáñez
  - Deputies: Federal deputies: • 7; • 2
  - Legislature: Congress of Morelos

Area
  - Total: 4,893 km^{2} (1,889 sq mi)
  - Water: 11.8 km^{2} (4.6 sq mi)
- Ranked 30th
- Elevation: 1,418 m (4,652 ft)
- Highest elevation: 5,419 m (17,779 ft)
- Lowest elevation: 800 m (2,600 ft)

Population (2020)
  - Total: 1,971,520
  - Rank: 23rd
  - Density: 402.9/km^{2} (1,044/sq mi)
  - Rank: 2nd
- Demonym: Morelense

GDP (2022)
  - Total: MXN 314 billion (US$15.6 billion)
  - Per capita: US$7,861
- Time zone: UTC−6 (CST)
- Postal code: 62
- Area code: Area codes: • 731; • 734; • 735; • 737; • 739; • 751; • 769; • 777
- ISO 3166 code: MX-MOR
- HDI: ▲0.788 high Ranked 17th of 32
- Website: Official Web Site

Morelos, (Note: Spanish pronunciation: [moˈɾelos]) officially the Free and Sovereign State of Morelos, (Note: Spanish: Estado Libre y Soberano de Morelos) is a landlocked state located in south-central Mexico. It is one of the 32 states which comprise the Federal Entities of Mexico. It is divided into 36 municipalities and its capital city is Cuernavaca.

Morelos is bordered by Mexico City to the north, and by the states of México to the northeast and northwest, Puebla to the east and Guerrero to the southwest.

Morelos is the second-smallest state in the nation, just after Tlaxcala. It was part of a very large province, the State of Mexico, until 1869 when President Benito Juárez decreed that its territory would be separated and named in honor of José María Morelos y Pavón, who defended the city of Cuautla from royalist forces during the Mexican War of Independence. Most of the state enjoys a warm climate year-round, which is good for the raising of sugar cane and other crops. Morelos has attracted visitors from the Valley of Mexico since Aztec times.

The state is also known for the Chinelos, a type of costumed dancer that appears at festivals, especially Carnival, which is celebrated in a number of communities in the state. It is also home to the Monasteries on the slopes of Popocatépetl, a designated World Heritage Site.

== History ==
=== Pre-Hispanic period ===
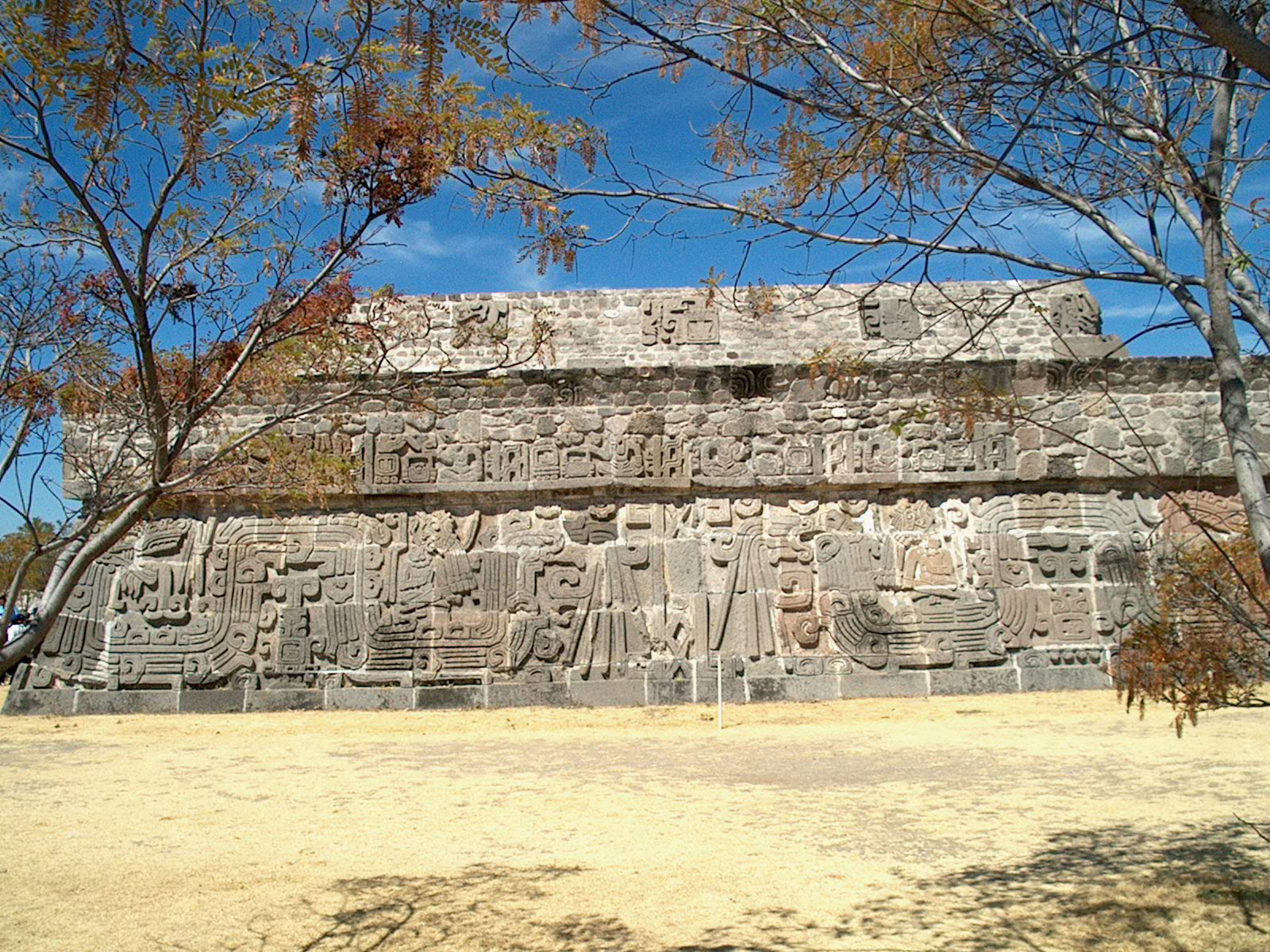
Temple of the Feathered Serpent, Xochicalco

Historian Ward Barrett considers that the "region now known as Morelos has a physical unity sufficient to define and set it in strong contrast to other regions of Mexico." Much of this definition comes from its geography, which is a basin into which abundant water flows. The arrival of the Spanish shifted agriculture from subsistence maize production and cotton cultivation to sugar cane and the refining of such into sugar in nearby mills. This system would remain more or less intact until the Mexican Revolution.

Evidence of the first human inhabitants in what is now Morelos dates back to 6000 B.C. and shows these people as nomadic hunters and gatherers in the areas of Yautepec and Chimalacatlan. Other early finds include clay jars and figures in the Gualupita neighborhood of Cuernavaca and three mounds in Santa María Ahuacatitlán, which are probably the remains of houses.

Francisco Plancarte y Navarrete, Cuernavaca's second bishop (1898–1911), wrote Tamoanchan—El Estado de Morelos y El Principio de la Civilizacion en Mexico in 1911. In it, he proposes that the first agriculturally based settlements in Mexico appeared around 1500 B.C. in a place called Tamoanchan which he associates with Morelos. He writes, "1st - That being in the region of Tamoanchan... they fixed the ritual calendar ... 2nd - That Tamoanchan was not very far from Teotihuacan; 3rd - That to go from Tamoanchan to Teotihuacan they passed through Xumiltepec; 4th - That Tepuztecal (sic) and his companions discovered pulque in the Tamoanchan region. But as all these facts happened in... the State of Morelos ... and accordingly that Tamoanchan is not a mythological and fantastic country... but true..."

The earliest identified culture is the Olmec, which was dominant from 200 B. C. to about A.D. 500. Evidence of this culture is found in reliefs such as those in the Cantera Mountain in Chalcatzingo and clay figures.

After the Olmec period, the area was invaded by several waves of migration from the Valley of Mexico in the north. The settlement of Mazatepec was founded in A. D. 603 by the Toltecs. A second wave of Toltecs established the city-state of Xochicalco (the City of Flowers). Their influence is evident in Teotihuacan at the temple of Quetzalcoatl, but there are also signs of Mayan, Mixtec and Zapotec influences. The last wave of Toltecs arrived in the 12th century. There are two groups from this wave. The first to arrive were the Xochimilcas, who settled in places such as Tetela, Hueyapan, Tepoztlán, and Xumiltepec. Shortly afterwards the Tlahuicas arrived and settled in and around Cuauhnáhuac (Cuernavaca) by 1250. There is evidence that indicates the Tlauhuicas probably would have been expelled from Morelos by the Xochimilcas if they had not been protected by Xólotl, lord of Acolhua, who granted territory to Tochintecutli, the first lord of Cuauhnáhuac (Cuernavaca). The Tlahuicas are believed to be an offshoot of the Toltec-Chichimec group of Nahuatl-speaking peoples who have occupied the area since the seventh century.

The Tlahuica eventually became the dominant ethnic group in Morelos. They were organized into about fifty small city-states, each with a hereditary ruler (tlatoani). Each Tlahuica city-state consisted of a central town, with its temple, plaza, palace, and the surrounding countryside and villages. The largest of these were Cuauhnáhuac and Huaxtepec (Oaxtepec). These people had advanced knowledge of astronomy and a highly developed agricultural system. They were especially known for growing cotton, which was planted wherever the land could be irrigated. Tlahuica women spun and wove cloth, which became an important item for exchange and for paying tribute.

The Mexica or Aztec began to arrive as early as 1398, but efforts to dominate this area began in the 1420s. In the 1420s and 1430s, Cuauhnáhuac and Xiutepec (Jiutepec) were conquered by Itzcoatl. In the middle of the 15th century, other city-states in Morelos made war on Aztec-held Cuauhnahuac and the Aztecs used this as an excuse to conquer areas such as Yautepec, Tetlama and other locations, eventually dominating the entire state. The inclusion of the area into the Aztec Empire was sealed with marriage of Aztec emperor Huitzilihuitl to Miahuaxochitl, daughter of the lord of Cuauhnáhuac. This union produced a son who would become Aztec emperor Moctezuma Ilhuicamina. These conquered areas were allowed to keep their local political structures so long as a tribute, which mostly consisted of cotton items, was paid. However, the Mexica later replaced the rulers of Cuauhnahuac, Xochitepec, Tepoztlan and Oaxtepec in 1487. The territory was divided into two tributary provinces, one centered on Cuauhnáhuac and the other centered on Huaxtepec. Each of these territories had a population of over 50,000 by the 16th century.

Moctezuma Ilhuicamina succeeded Izcóatl, and tradition has it that he established a botanical garden in Huaxtepec (Oaxtepec). Moctezuma's favorite swimming area is thought to have been a pond called Poza Azul, now part of a resort run by Six Flags Hurricane Harbor.

The Mexica built a number of fortifications in the area, notably in the hills called El Sombrerito and Tlatoani near Tlayacapan. The pyramid of Tepozteco in Tepoztlán may have been designed as a fort and lookout post. During this time, the Tlauhuica built the double-pyramid known as Teopanzolco in Cuernavaca.

=== Conquest and colonial period ===
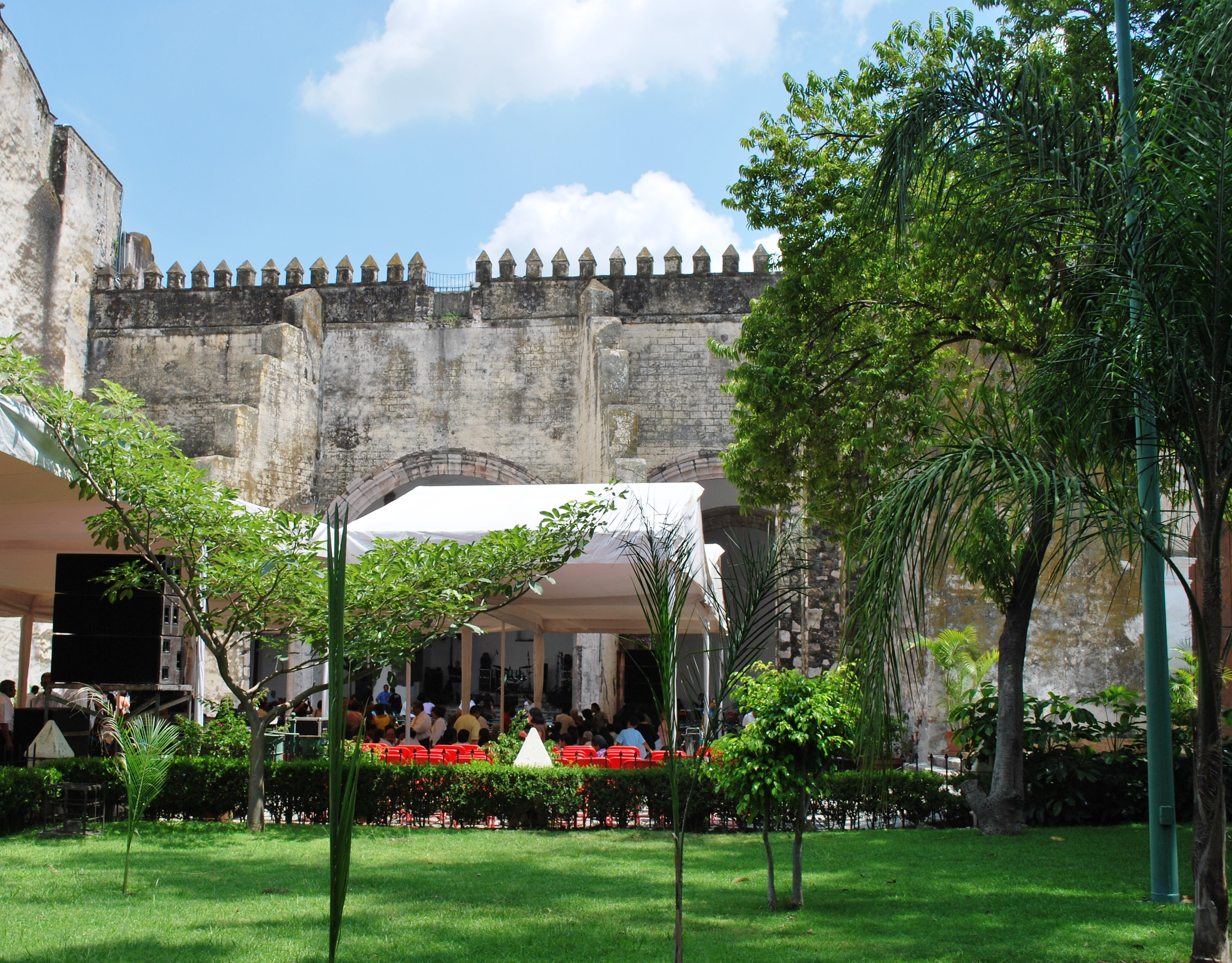
Capilla abierta of the current Cathedral of Cuernavaca

Population estimates for the beginning of the 16th century are: Cuauhnáhuac, 50,000; Huaxtepec, 50,000; Yautepec, 30,000; Tepoztlán, 20,000; Totolapan, 20,000; and 12,000 each for Tlayacapan, Tetela, Yecapixtla, and Ocuituco.

The Spanish under Hernán Cortés arrived in central Mexico in 1519. After Cortés's defeat in Tenochtitlan (La Noche Triste) and retreat into Tlaxacala in 1520, he sent expeditions to Morelos. One of the first Mexicas to accept Spanish authority was in Ocuituco. Gonzalo de Sandoval then set out with 8,000 men for Huaxtepec (Oaxtepec). After a two-day fight, Sandoval returned to Texcoco to inform Cortes of his victory. Cortes returned with 20,000 men and defeated Tlayacapan on 8 April. Cortes then went to Huaxtepec, spent a night in the beautiful gardens, and moved on to Yautepec. The Spanish burned the town, and Tepoztlan surrendered. Cortes continued his march on Xiutepec (Jiutepec) and on 13 April faced the city of Cuauhnahuac (Cuernavaca). The bridges across the Ravine of Annanalco had been destroyed, but both Cortes and Bernal Diaz del Castillo relate how they were able to cross the ravine upriver via a fallen tree. The cacique of Cuauhnahuac surrendered quickly, and Cortes burned and sacked the city, and the women were raped. After spending the night in nearby Acapantzingo, Cortes moved on to Coajomulco before marching on Xochimilco. Cortes returned to Cuernavaca after the fall of Tenochtitlan, where he established a hacienda and constructed the Palace of Cortés five years later.

Only two years after the fall of Tenochtitlan (Mexico City), in the year 1523, the first church was built in Tlatenango, and over the next 50 years 500 religious constructions were built in the state.

In 1529, Cortés was named the Marquis of the Valley of Oaxaca, which gave him control over 4,000 km^{2} (1,500 sq mi) of territory in Morelos with Cuernavaca as the seat of authority over about eighty communities, eight haciendas, and two sugar cane plantations. These lands stayed in the Cortés family until 1809 when the government confiscated all of the lands of the Marquis. There are house-to-house censuses from the mid-1530s from communities around Cuernavaca that are the earliest extant local-level documentation in Nahuatl, likely due to a dispute between Cortés and the crown about the number of tributaries of the Marquesado del Valle de Oaxaca. These Indigenous censuses make it possible to establish an early colonial-era base-line for household structure, land holding, tribute obligations, and rates of baptism and Church marriage.

=== Independence to end of 19th century ===
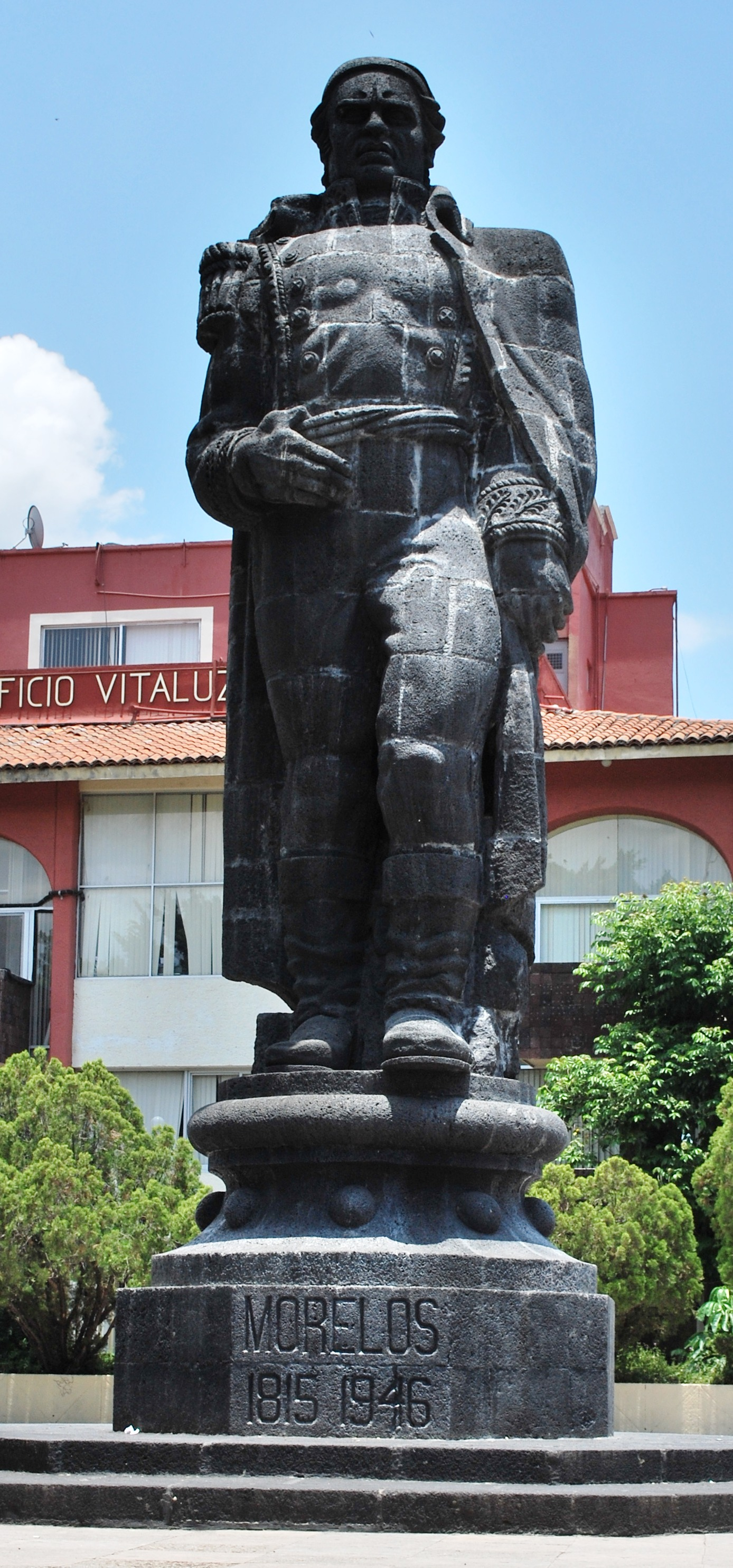
Monument to Morelos

The conditions on the sugar plantations of Morelos made Father Miguel Hidalgo's call to take up arms well received by the indigenous and mestizo populations of the state. The first rebellions broke out in 1811, with some early successes. An early insurgent leader in the state was Francisco Ayala. Insurgents from the state managed to push as far as Chalco in what is now Mexico State when royalist forces pushed them back in 1812. After Hidalgo was executed (30 July 1811), José María Morelos y Pavon took over the insurgent effort, joined by Mariano Matamoros of Jantetelco.

By 1812, insurgents had control of the city of Cuautla, and royalist forces began to put it under siege. Morelos and his men held out for 58 days when reinforcement arrived, breaking the Siege of Cuautla. This was one of the early vital wins for the insurgent movement. Morelos would eventually be captured by royalists and executed in 1815, but the memory of this battle would lead to the future state being named after him.

In the post-war period, the sugar industry of Morelos made this region one of the richest parts of the Mexican Republic. Much of this sugar made its way to European markets. As a result, the city of Cuernavaca, serving as an important trade center for exports, became a well-established outpost along the Camino Real (Royal Road) to Acapulco. But the sugar cane estates were worlds unto themselves: great luxury for the (often absentee) owners and misery, debt, and poverty for the workers.

After winning independence, what is now the state of Morelos was the district of Cuernavaca as part of the very large State of Mexico, created in 1824. The entity would change status between state and department depending on whether liberal or conservative factions were in charge. Under the Constitution of 1857, the State of Mexico and all other states would keep their federal status permanently.

Cuernavaca gained the title of city in 1834. During the Mexican–American War, this city was taken by the Americans under General Cadwalader.

The next conflict was the uprising against President Antonio López de Santa Anna under the Plan of Ayutla in 1854. Armed rebellion broke out in Cuautla, and Santa Anna responded by burning entire villages. However, the rebellion dislodged Santa Anna, naming Juan Álvarez as president. Alvarez moved the Mexican capital to Cuernavaca. A new constitutional convention was called and when the 1857 Constitution was proclaimed, Alvarez retired and the capital moved back to Mexico City.

The new constitution did not stop fighting among conservative and liberal factions in Mexico, which escalated again into the Reform War from 1858 to 1861. While Cuautla was a liberal bastion, Cuernavaca was a stronghold for the conservatives; roamed by bandits who burned and destroyed the haciendas of Pantitlán and Xochimancas, terrorizing villagers. Ignacio Manuel Altamirano wrote a novel, set in Yautepec, about the war and the bandits, called El Zarco: Episodios de la Vida Mexicana en 1861–63. The war ended on 11 January 1861, when Benito Juárez took control of Mexico City.

The division between the liberal and conservative parts of the state remained through the French Intervention in Mexico. When the French Army invaded Mexico, Francisco Leyva raised an army in Morelos to fight in the Battle of Puebla of 5 May 1862. Despite the heroic efforts on that day, the French eventually managed to gain control of the country and install Maximilian of Habsburg as emperor in 1864. Maximilian chose the Jardin Borda in Cuernavaca as his summer residence, and he built La Casa del Olindo in Acapantzingo, Cuernavaca supposedly for Margarita Leguizmo Sedano, his mistress known as "La India Bonita." The French emperor improved the roads from Mexico City to Cuernavaca; telegraph service between the two began in 1866. However, resistance to French rule was well underway. On 1 January 1867, Republican troops under the leadership of Francisco Leyva, Ignacio Figueroa, and Ignacio Manuel Altamirano began an eight-day siege of Cuernavaca. France, under Napoleon III, withdrew its troops soon after that, and Maximilian was defeated by Republican forces and executed.

After the French were expelled by forces under Benito Juárez, there were efforts to divide the State of Mexico. This resulted in the approval of the state of Morelos on 21 September 1868, by the federal Congress, followed by the official admittance of Morelos as the country's 27th state on 17 April 1869. The territory of the state was the Third Military District of the State of Mexico as defined by the Juárez government; the name "Morelos" and the capital "Cuernavaca" were selected by the state's first legislature. The first state constitution was finalized in 1870, and Francisco Leyva Arciniegas became the first Constitutional Governor of Morelos. There were boundary disputes between the new state with Mexico State and the Federal District, but these were resolved by the 1890s.

A telegraph line from Mexico City to Cuernavaca had been laid between 1867 and 1869; in 1870 it was extended to Iguala, Chilpancingo, and Tixla. Another line, between Cuernavaca and Cuautla, was laid in 1875. Attempts were made to improve education, but limited funds made that virtually impossible. Other infrastructure projects in the late 19th century included the Toluca-Cuernavaca highway, and a rail line between Mexico City and Cuautla. 200 people died when a train plunged into the San Antonio River at the Puente de Escontzin (Escontzin Bridge) near Cuautla in what became known as the Morelos railway accident on 23 June 1881. Rail lines would continue to be built into the 20th century, connecting the state further with Mexico City and the Pacific Ocean. On 11 May 1874, the capital was moved to Cuautla; it was returned to Cuernavaca on 1 January 1876.

During the long presidency of Porfirio Diaz (1877–1911), the economy of Morelos continued to be dominated by the large sugar plantations. The sugar cane estates were modernized and began to use steam-driven mills and centrifugal extractors. These changes created a great new demand for the water and land resources needed to grow sugar cane. As a result, the haciendas expanded steadily, but only at the expense of the peasants, who were unfairly deprived of their land by the hacienda owners. Between 1884 and 1905, eighteen towns in Morelos disappeared as lands were taken by the haciendas.

The Roman Catholic Diocese of Cuernavaca was established in 1894 with Fortino Hipólito Vera as the first bishop (1894–1898). He was followed by Francisco Plancarte y Navarrete (1898–1911).

=== Revolution and 20th century ===
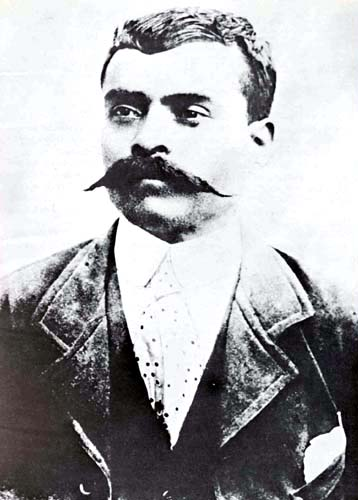
Emiliano Zapata

==== Díaz, Madero and Zapata ====
This situation made the state ripe for the Mexican Revolution and the base for one of the best-known revolutionaries from this period, Emiliano Zapata, who was born in Anenecuilco, Ciudad Ayala. Some of the first outbreaks of violence took place in Cuernavaca under Genovevo de la O from Santa María Ahuacatitlán in 1910. Zapata's victory in the bloody Battle of Cuautla (11–19 May 1911) brought about Porfirio Diaz's abdication, but also led to the press labeling Zapata the Attila of the South. But then, Government forces led by Victoriano Huerta attacked towns and cities in the state, trying to take it back. Shortly afterwards, on 17 August, revolutionaries sacked Jojutla.

Zapata felt betrayed by Francisco Madero, and following Madero's election as president on 6 November 1911, Zapata and his followers called for agrarian reform in the Plan de Ayala. Contrary to popular belief, the state's motto, Tierra y Libertad (Land and Liberty) did not originate with Zapata or the Plan de Ayala; it was first used by Ricardo Flores Magón in the magazine Regeneración on 1 October 1910.

With the outbreak of Revolution, a new bishop, Manuel Fulcheri y Pietrasanta was chosen to head the Roman Catholic diocese (6 May 1912 – 21 April 1922)

==== Zapata and Huerta ====
"El exterminio de Morelos"
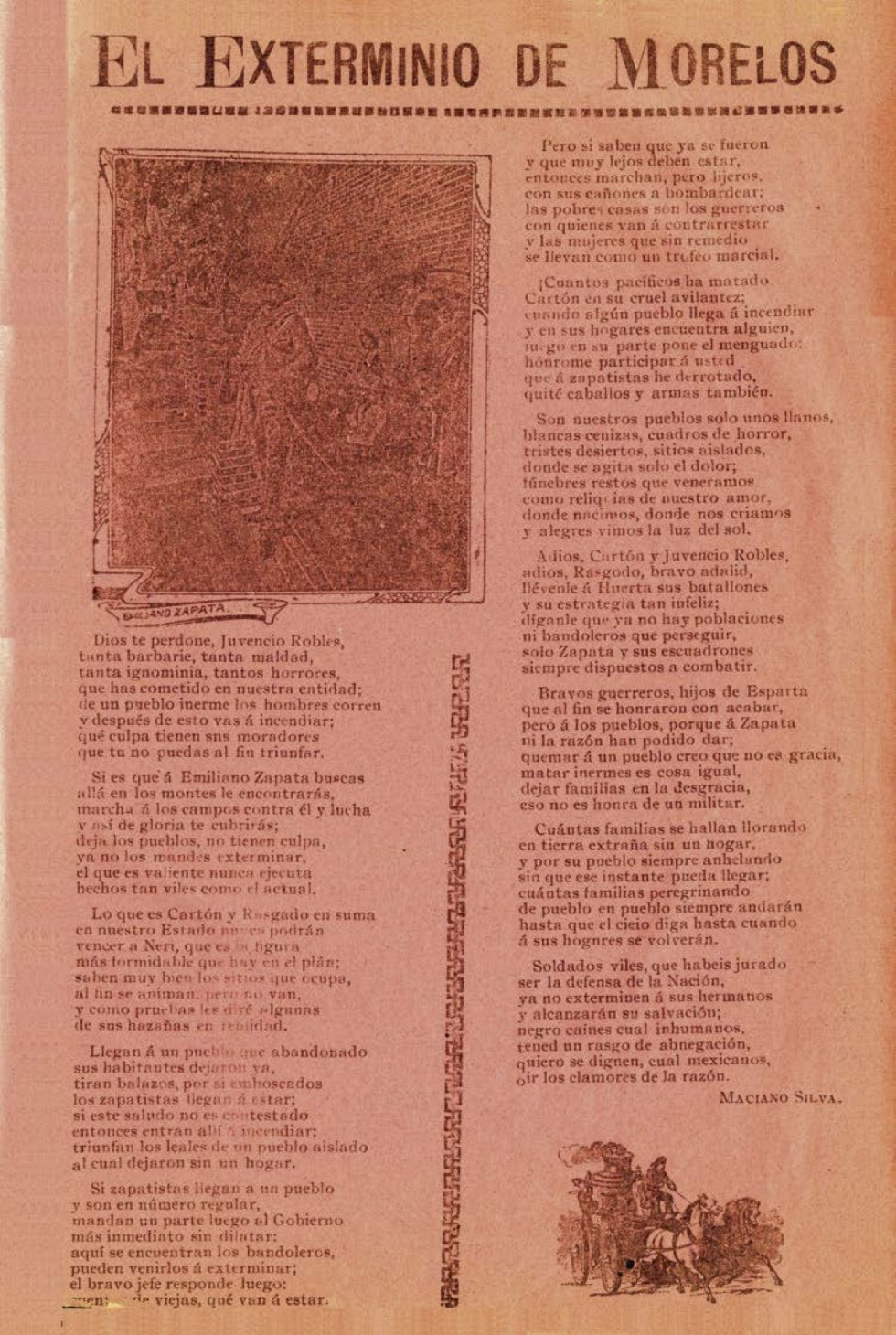
- "El exterminio de Morelos" Lyric sheet
- "El exterminio de Morelos" ("The extermination of Morelos") A verse of "El exterminio de Morelos" ("The extermination of Morelos," in Spanish), a corrido written by Marciano Silva during the Mexican Revolution about the violence the state faced during the campaign of General Juvencio Robles.

Madero was assassinated; Victoriano Huerta took over the government, but he was soon put on the run. In May 1914, Zapata, with a force of 3,600 men, took control of the southern Jojutla district. By this time, Cuernavaca was the only important town in Morelos that the Federal forces held onto. It took 72 days to take Cuernavaca, after which he marched on Milpa Alta (Mexico City).

==== Zapata and Carranza ====
Huerta was defeated, and 1915 was fairly peaceful in Morelos. However, by December 1915, Zapata was forced to fight a new enemy—Venustiano Carranza. Carranza embarked upon an offensive that retook significant parts of the state of Morelos. By the spring of 1916, Zapata was forced to abandon several of his strongholds. The biggest loss came on 2 May 1916, when Zapata lost Cuernavaca to enemy forces, which now numbered some 30,000 troops. As Zapata continued to lose ground, his forces were forced to return to the guerilla warfare that they had waged a few years earlier. They retook Cuernavaca in January, 1916, but he generally lost ground to the Constitutionalists. The Zapatistas imposed a heavy tax on haciendas; when the owners refused to pay, the rebels burned the cane fields such as those of Chinameca, Tenango, Treinta, Atilhuayan, Santa Iñes, and San Gabriel. Then, on 17 April 1919, Zapata was betrayed and ambushed at Chinameca. Zapata's remains are currently in Cuautla at the foot of a statue erected in his honor.

When the Constitutionalists split and Minister of War Álvaro Obregón was forced to flee, he and Zapata's chief of staff and successor Gildardo Magaña joined forces and defeated Carranza. Obregón's government duly reciprocated with legislating a land reform in Morelos according to the Plan de Ayala principles.

==== 1920 to 1966 ====
In 1926 President Plutarco Elias Calles ordered a number of restrictions on the Catholic Church, precipitating the so-called Cristero War. While the Catholic Church generally opposed the Mexican Revolution, many former Zapatistas joined the rebellion in Morelos. Groups led by Benjamin Mendoza in Coatlán del Río; Nicolas Zamora in Tetlama, Temixco; and Rafael Castañada in Alpuyeca, Xochitepec, joined the Cristeros. They were quickly put down by Governor Ambrosia Punte in 1927.

Since the Revolution, the state's history has centered on development and crime. There were several assaults along the Mexico City-Cuernavaca highway in 1928 and again in 1934. There was a train robbery in 1928, and several major train accidents in the 1930s. The statue of the Virgin of Guadalupe in El Calvario (Cuernavaca) was destroyed by vandals in 1934. Striking police went of a crime wave in 1937. Five thousand rioters protested when the Cuernavaca police killed Jorge Garrigós in 1957. The municipal president of Jiutepec was assassinated on 26 May 1958. In 1960, three government officials in Cuernavaca were fired because of embezzlement.

From 1943 to 1944, and again from 1953 to 1958, Rubén Jaramillo led peasant revolts against the government. Despite promises and a guarantee of his safety from presidents Manuel Ávila Camacho in 1944 and Adolfo López Mateos in 1958, Jaramillo was gunned down in Xochicalco by federal police on 23 May 1962. A cache of weapons was discovered in Colonia Rubén Jaramillo, Temixco, in September 1973.

As for development, Morelos adopted a new Constitution on 20 November 1930. Gambling was outlawed and the Casino de la Selva in Cuernavaca was closed in 1934, which had been a mecca for American mobsters and Hollywood film stars. The Buenavista-Tepoztlán highway was built in 1936, and the Mexico City-Cuernavaca tollway opened in 1952. Highway construction eventually led to the closing of a number of rail lines including the Mexico City-Cuernavaca-Iguala line in 1963.

Datsun began manufacturing automobiles in Jiutepec in 1961. The first industrial park of Morelos, Civac (Industrial City of the Valley of Cuernavaca), opened in 1966, confiscating 4,000 hectares (9,900 acres) of communal land in Tejalpa, Jiutepec with virtually no compensation. Mayekewa and Nissan were among the first companies to locate there.

A major water park with capacity for 20,000 visitors, was opened in Oaxtepec by IMSS (Mexican Social Security Institution) in 1966. When Mexico hosted the XIX 1968 Summer Olympics, the Junior Games were in Oaxtepec. The water park was sold to Six Flags Hurricane Harbor in 2016.

There were two major disasters in 1962: in March, a bus fell off a cliff near the Lagunas de Zempoala National Park in Huitzilac, killing 22 and injuring 36. An earthquake in Cuernavaca in May killed 22, injured dozens, and destroyed two buildings.

Four Roman Catholic bishops served during this period: Francisco Uranga y Sáenz (21 April 1922 - 8 8 July 1930), Francisco María González y Arias (30 January 1931 - 20 20 August 1946), Alfonso Espino y Silva (2 August 1947 – 15 May 1951), and Sergio Méndez Arceo † (11 11 March 1952 - 28 December 1982). Mendez Arceo He is remembered as the force behind the growth of basic ecclesial communities (Spanish: Comunidades Eclesiales de Base) (CEB) in Mexico during the 1970s, for his support of Austrian philosopher Ivan Illich and his Centro Intercultural de Documentación (English: Intercultural Documentation Center), and as a supporter of both human rights and liberation theology. Mendez Arceo was also responsible for the restoration and remodeling of the Cuernavaca Cathedral that led to the discovery of the murals about St. Philip of Jesus and companions.

==== 1967 to 2000 ====
As it has been since Aztec times, the state, especially Cuernavaca, has been a favorite retreat for those in Mexico City due to its warm year-round climate. That, plus pollution and the 19 September, 1985 Mexico City earthquake, have spurred a major housing boom which continues to this day. Most of this boom is centered on the city of Cuernavaca but also Cuautla and other places.

In the late 1990s and early 2000s, the major crime problem was kidnapping for ransom. The kidnapping crime wave caused investment in the state to drop from a high of US$245 million in 1999 to $102 million in 2002, with the state lagging behind the country in job creation. The state broke the kidnapping rings in the early 2000s, mostly by arresting corrupt lawyers, police, and judges who were protecting kidnapping rings, includes one run by Daniel "Mocha Orejas" Arizmendi, who received his nickname by cutting off his victims' ears and sending them to family members. The busts brought the kidnapping rate to below national average. Governor Jorge Carrillo Olea (1994–1998) was forced to resign after being accused of covering for kidnappers.

Roman Catholic bishops during this era were Juan Jesús Posadas Ocampo (28 December 1982 – 15 May 1987) and Luis Reynoso Cervantes (17 August 1987 – 20 December 2000).

=== 21st century ===
==== 2000 to 2009 ====
The kidnapping problems have been replaced with violence related to the drug trade, despite the fact that Morelos is far from the U.S. border. The 2009 slaying of kingpin Arturo Beltrán Leyva set off a turf war for his successor. It has increased the number of gun battles and gangland-style executions. Anonymous email threats succeed in keeping people away from Cuernavaca at night, with bars and nightclubs closing when such communications threaten drug violence. In 2004, Governor Sergio Estrada ordered the mass firing of all of the state police officers after top police commanders were arrested on charges that they were working with drug traffickers. This caused a major political battle for the governor, who then himself was accused of cooperating with drug rings, with attempts to take him out of office. The area around Lagunas de Zempoala National Park, on Morelos's border with Mexico City, is one of Mexico's 16 most dangerous regions, in part due to the narcotics trade.

The state is considered to be one of the most dangerous, despite its small size and population. Most crime is centered in Cuernavaca. Its crime rate surpasses that of Mexico City in terms of crimes per 1,000 people. It is over 50% higher than the national average. Although Cuernavaca has only 21% of the population, it suffers 45% of the crime committed in the state. There are a number of possible causes. Some blame the judicial system for being inept and there are strong links to the drug trafficking trade, en route to Mexico City.

==== 2010 to 2019 ====
In the election of 1 July 2018, the coalition Juntos Haremos Historia won the governorship (Cuauhtémoc Blanco) and 16 of 33 municipalities, PRD-PSD won 4, PAN-MC won 3, PRI won 2, PVEM won 4, Nueva Alianca won 2, and Humanista won 1.

On 30 December 2018, the newly formed National Guard took over police functions in Cuernavaca, Jiutepec, and Yautepec.

Starting 1 January 2019, three new municipios were created in Morelos: Xoxocotla; Hueyapan; and Coatetelco. All three are Indigenous communities that will have increased autonomy.

The federal government held a referendum on 23 February−24, 2019, to decide whether to build a thermoelectric plant and a gas pipeline in Huexca, Yecapixtla. Voters in Morelos and parts of the states of Puebla and Tlaxcala were asked if they supported the completion of $22 billion peso (U.S.$1.6 billion) plant completed in September 2017 but not put into operation due to lack of connection to the Cuautla River. Two opponents of the plant, Ruben Fajardo and Samir Flores Soberanes were murdered and there were violent protests during the public consultation. 59.5% of the 55,715 citizens voted in favor of construction, and 40.1% voted against. A number of safety and environmental factors have not yet been resolved.

A 10:00 a.m. on 8 May, 2019 shooting in downtown Cuernavaca left two dead and two injured. The shooting occurred during a demonstration by merchants who do not have fixed addresses. Governor Cuauhtemoc Blanco has cited the need for support from the National Guard to combat violence in the state. This comes three months after a shooting in Bar Sofia, which left one dead and nine injured, and the police chief was replaced.

Earthquakes of September, 2017

Morelos was hit by two strong earthquakes in September 2017. On 7 September, the 2017 Chiapas earthquake did some serious shaking in Morelos although no physical damage or injuries were reported in Morelos. The second, on 19 September, 2017 was disastrous in Morelos. The epicenter was 12 kilometers southeast of Axochiapan, at a depth of 57 kilometers. Seventy-five people died in Morelos, principally in Jojutla and in the eastern part of the state; 200 people were hospitalized, 5,000 homes, 10 hospitals, 186 schools, and 4 dams were damaged. The 11 municipalities most affected were Jojutla, Axochiapan, Cuernavaca, Miacatlán, Tlayacapan, Xochitepec, Yautepec, Jantetelco, Ocuituco, Yecapixtla, and Emiliano Zapata. In Cuernavaca, 4 people were killed, the landmark Torre Latinoamericana collapsed, and 11 churches were damaged.

As the citizens of Mexico and of Morelos, as well as foreign governments, rushed to help those affected, Governor Graco Ramírez and his wife, Elena Cepeda de Leon, head of DIF Morelos (Department of Children and Families) were accused of deviating at least two large trucks of supplies for political purposes. The governor and his wife denied the allegations, explaining that they were simply organizing the delivery. However, they never explained why all the food and other supplies were labeled as if they had come from DIF Morelos rather than their true places of origin.

The ISSSTE hospital in Zapata was forced to work on the street for two months, and the Hospital Parres in Cuernavaca was unserviceable for a year after the earthquake. Over a year later, people in Jojutla were still homeless.

==== 2020 to 2029 ====
32 of the 36 mayors of municipalities in the state demonstrated in the Zócalo against Governor Cuauhtémoc Blanco on 1 February 2020. They were demanding the restoration of MXN $1,000,000,000 (US $50 million) in federal funds to pay for police.

Roman Catholic bishops of the 21st century have been: Florencio Olvera Ochoa (22 February 2002 – 10 July 2009), Alfonso Cortés Contreras (10 July 2009 - 22 22 December 2012), and Ramón Castro Castro (15 May 2013 – present). In March 2020, Castro Castro blessed the 2020 census workers as the Roman Catholic population in Mexico decreases.

Morelos had its first case of infection during the COVID-19 pandemic in Mexico in mid-March, about the same time that Mexico entered Phase 2 of the pandemic and schools were closed. Drugstores in Cuernavaca reported shortages of masks, antibacterial gel, and other items. The first death was on 28 March, a 37-year-old man who had traveled to Italy. President López Obrador and Governor Blanco dedicated the ISSSTE hospital "Carlos Calero" in Cuernavaca, set aside to care for patients with COVID-19. As of 17 May 2020, there were 153 deaths and 1,105 confirmed cases in the state. 158 health workers contracted the virus and two died. 46% of the cases were treated at hospitals run by Servicios de Salud de Morelos (SSM), 38% by the Instituto Mexicano del Seguro Social (IMSS), 13% by the Instituto de Seguridad y Servicios Sociales de los Trabajadores del Estado (ISSSTE), and 1% by private hospitals. The federal government announced it would pay the families of health workers who died because of the virus MXN $50,000. Morelos passed 2,000 confirmed cases on 14 June and continued in ′′Semaforo Rojo′′ (Maximum Alert) until 21 June. The state health department reported that the first 9,759 doses of the Pfizer–BioNTech COVID-19 vaccine arrived in the state for application in health workers on 12 January 2021. Four bottles containing twenty doses were stolen from "Carlos Calero Elorduy Hospital" run by SEDENA two days later. After an increase in 1,000 serious cases in three days in January 2021, G. Parres and Carlos Calero hospitals in Cuernavaca as well as the COVID-19 hospitals in Jojutla and Axochiapan reported they were full to 100% capacity. ISSSTE in Zapata reported 90% of its beds were occupied. Radamés Salazar Solorio, senator from MORENA, died of COVID-19 on 21 February. Temixco became the first municipality to vaccinate senior citizens (60+) with 15,170 doses of AstraZeneca vaccine.

Twenty-one people died in May 2020 after drinking homemade alcohol in the eastern part of the state. A baby boy was registered using the surnames (Spanish: apellidos) of both his birth mother and her wife in May 2020, the first such case in Morelos. IMSS reported that 10,000 doses of flu vaccine were stolen from its hospital in eastern Morelos on 12 October 2020.

Nineteen political parties registered for the 2021 Mexican legislative election in Morelos. They are: PSD, MORENA, PT, PAN, MC, PRI, Panal, PRD, PES, PVEM, PH, Sumando Voluntades Podemos Construir, Más Más Apoyo Social, Morelos Progresa, Movimiento Alternativa Social, Bienestar Ciudadano, Renovación Política Morelense, Fuerza, Trabajo u Unidad por el Rescate Oportuno de Morelos, and Morelos Fuerza.

== Geography ==
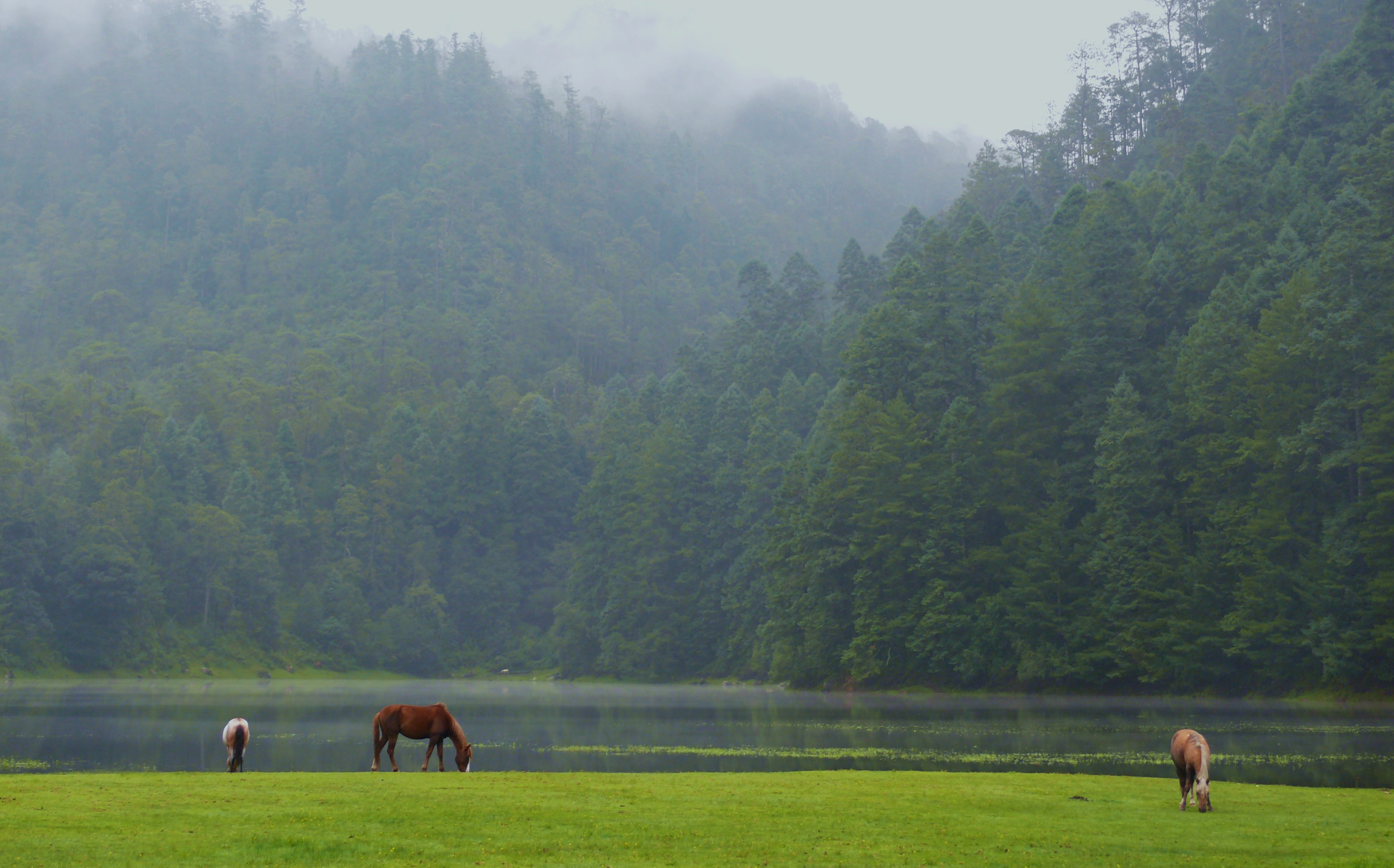
Laguna de Zempoala National Park

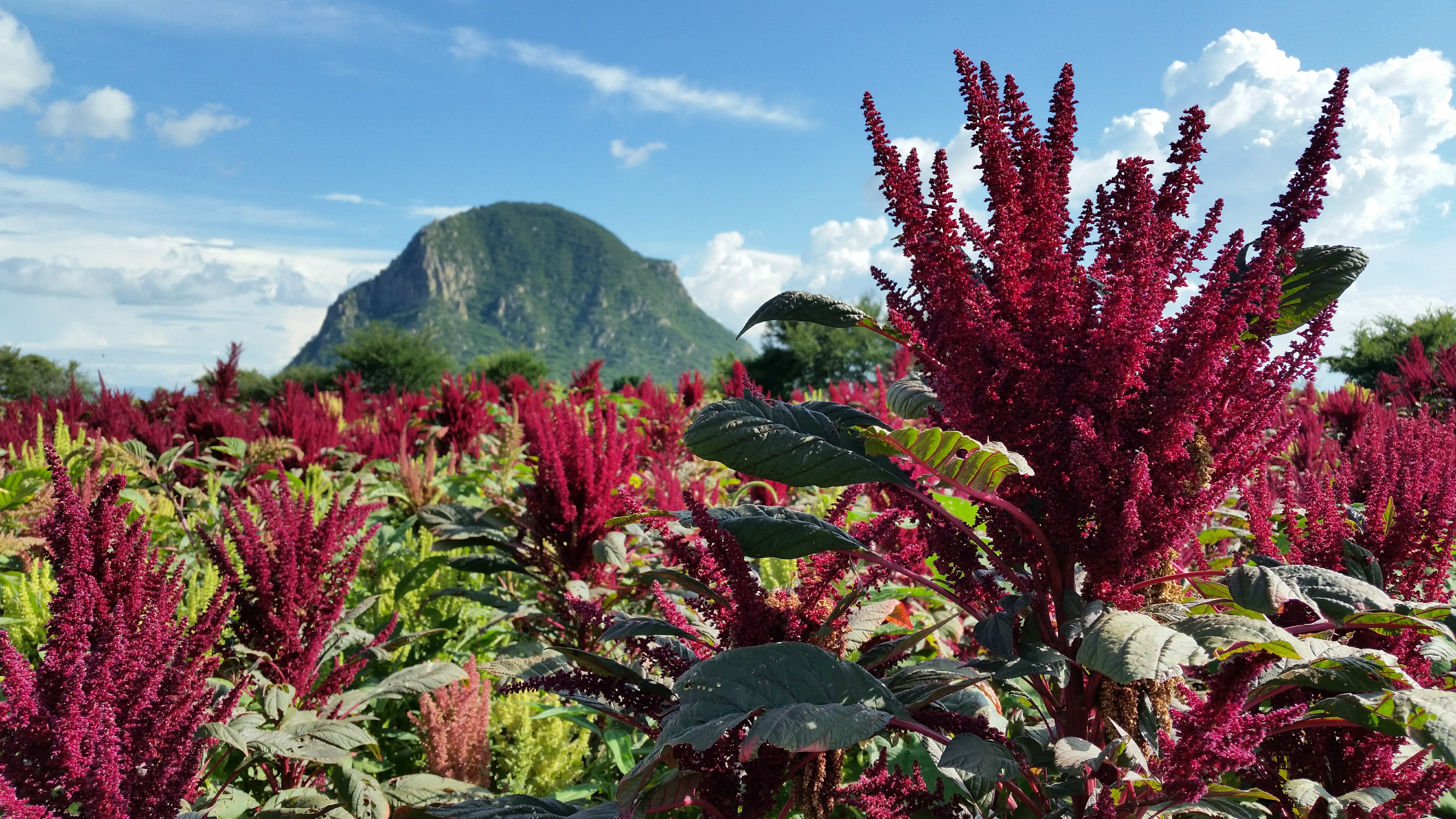
Field of amaranth in Temoac with the Cerro del Chumil visible in the background

The state is located in the center of the country and has an area of 4,893 km^{2} (1,889 sq mi), accounting for 0.25% of Mexico's total territory. It is the second smallest state after Tlaxcala. It shares borders with the Federal District of Mexico City, the State of Mexico, Guerrero, and Puebla. The state's capital is Cuernavaca. It was the largest city of the Tlahuicas and originally called Cuauhnahuac, but the Spanish changed it to the current name which means "Cow Horn" in Spanish. This city is only 90 km south of Mexico City and due to its gentle climate is referred to as "The City of the Eternal Spring."

Morelos, most of which is between 1,000 and 3,300 meters (3,300 and 10,800 ft) above sea level, has a very diverse topography: 42% is mountainous, 16% hilly land, and 42% flat terrain. The highest altitudes are found near the state's border with Mexico City, and the lowest are found in the Huaxtla region. The state straddles two main geographic formations, the Trans-Mexican Volcanic Belt in the north and east and the Sierra Madre del Sur, which stretches south and west from Cuernavaca and Jiutepec. The majestic mountain peaks of the Sierra Ajusco in the north of the state divide Morelos from the neighboring Valley of Mexico.

The state is in the highest part of the Balsas River basin, which ends in the north in the areas bounded by the Sierra Ajusco-Chichinautzin and the Popocatépetl volcano. From this point south, the state gradually slopes downward, interrupted by the Tlaltizapan and Yautepec mountains in the center of the state and the Sierra de Huautla in the south. Most of the rivers and streams of the state, including the Cuautla River, flow into the Amacuzac River on the border with the state of Guerrero, which itself is a major tributary of the Balsas River.

The climate and vegetation varies from alpine meadows in the highest elevations near Popocatepetl to lowland rainforest in the south. Roughly 70% of the state has a humid and relatively warm climate, especially in the highly populated areas of Cuernavaca, Tepotzlán, Oaxtepec and Yautepec. Average temperature is approximately 25 °C (77 °F) year-round, with a rainy season from May until September.

The climates can be further subdivided: hot and semi-humid; semi-hot and semi-humid; temperate and semi-humid; semi-cold and semi-humid; and cold. The hot and semi-humid climate covers about 78% of the state's territory, with an average temperature of 22 °C (72 °F), with rains in the summer. This area presents mostly subtropical-rainforest-type vegetation. The semi-hot and semi-humid climate can be found in a strip in the north of the state and accounts for 13% of the territory. Average temperature varies between 18 and 22 degrees Celsius, with rains in the summer and a dry season in the winter. A temperate and semi-humid climate covers about 10% of the territory and is found in the north of the state around the municipalities of Huitzilac, Tlanepantla, Totolapan, Tetela del Volcán and parts of Cuernavaca, Tepoztlan, Ocuituco, Tlayacapan and Miacatlán. This area has an average temperature of between 10 and 15 degrees Celsius, with mixed forests of pine and holm oak. A semi-cold and semi-humid climate accounts for only 2% of the territory and found along the borders of the Federal District, Mexico State, and Puebla. This area has pine forests and some alpine meadows. The coldest climate is found in the upper parts of Popocatepetl that belong to the state. Average temperature here is less than 5 degrees Celsius with frequent freezes. Most of the vegetation is alpine meadow or moss.

The natural resources of the state have been taken advantage of for centuries and have suffered changes as a consequence, especially in landscapes, water sources, flora, and fauna. This change accelerates as the population grows. The state has one major national park, the Lagunas de Zempoala. It is one of Mexico's largest national parks, located on the southern flank of the Sierra Madre mountains. The park had five mountain-fed lakes and abundant wildlife when the park was established in 1937. This park is being stressed due to illegal logging, with subsequent soil erosion and water from its last dark blue lake to drainage. Much of this drainage is to provide water to Cuernavaca, whose population uses 785 liters of water per day per person, twice that of Mexico City. The park's area has shrunk from 55,000 acres (220 km^{2}) to 12,500.

Much of the state's ecological woes stem from the housing explosion, which is mostly centered in the capital of Cuernavaca, but it is a problem in places such as Cuautla as well. Groups such as the Frente de Pueblos en Defensa de la Tierra y el Agua and Guardianes de los Àrboles have criticized the government for allowing city areas to grow with insufficient planning and control. They also claim that it is hurting much of the state's ecosystem and water supply.

Morelos has 39 open-pit mines covering an area of 15,025 hectares (37,130 acres), mostly in Temixco, Miacatlan, Xocitepec, and Cuernavaca. Mines of this sort often affect the health of both miners and people who live in nearby communities; they threaten the air, water supply, and soil in addition to the flora and fauna of the community. The Canadian company Alamos Gold has a concession to mine the cerro del Jumil which threatens the subsoil of the Xochicalco archaeological site.

Mexico is located near the North American, Pacific, Cocos, Rivera, and Caribbean Tectonic Plates, making the country highly susceptible to earthquakes. According to the Servicio Sismológico Nacional (SSN), there have been over 1,000 earthquakes near the borders of Morelos and Puebla State since 1900.

== Demographics ==
Largest cities or towns in Morelos Source:
Rank		Municipality	Pop.
1	Cuernavaca	Cuernavaca	365,168
2	Jiutepec	Jiutepec	196,953
3	Cuautla	Cuautla, Morelos	187,118
4	Temixco	Temixco	108,126
5	Yautepec de Zaragoza	Yautepec	97,857
6	Ciudad Ayala	Ayala	70,023
7	Emiliano Zapata	Emiliano Zapata	69,064
8	Puente de Ixtla	Puente de Ixtla	61,585
9	Xochitepec	Xochitepec	63,382
10	Jojutla de Juárez	Jojutla	55,115

Historical population
Year	Pop.	±%
1895	159,123	—
1900	160,115	+0.6%
1910	179,594	+12.2%
1921	103,440	−42.4%
1930	132,068	+27.7%
1940	182,711	+38.3%
1950	272,842	+49.3%
1960	386,264	+41.6%
1970	616,119	+59.5%
1980	947,089	+53.7%
1990	1,195,059	+26.2%
1995	1,442,662	+20.7%
2000	1,555,296	+7.8%
2005	1,612,899	+3.7%
2010	1,777,227	+10.2%
2015	1,903,811	+7.1%
2020	1,971,520	+3.6%

Morelos is the second-smallest state and ranks 25 out of 32 states in population, with 1.6% of Mexico's total population. However, it is ranked third in population density after Mexico City and the State of Mexico. 86% of the population lives in urban areas with only 14% in rural areas. Nationally, the figures are 76% and 24%. Just under 60% of the state's population lives in seven municipalities, which are Cuernavaca, Jiutepec, Temixco, Cuautla, Yautepec, Jojutla and Ayala. The most heavily populated area of the state is the city of Cuernavaca and its metropolitan area, with 21.95% of the total population. It is followed by the urban area of Cuautla-Yautepec-Ayala with just under 20%.

The state has had a higher than average population increase since the mid-1990s at about 4%. In some areas, population growth has been very high at points, such as in Jiutepec (over 21%) and Emiliano Zapata (over 15%). Much of this growth has been in the main cities of Cuernavaca, Cuautla, Ayala and Yautepec. This growth has meant the loss of the state's ability to feed itself, with less than 40% of grains consumed grown inside Morelos. Population growth has also put a strain on infrastructure such as water, sewer, potable water, electricity, roads, and schools.

The Catholic religion dominates, but there are significant minorities of evangelical Protestants and those of the Jewish faith.

The indigenous population of the state is estimated at 8%, just under the national average of 10%. However, only 2% of the population is counted as speaking an indigenous language compared to 7% nationally. The total counted in 2005 by INEGI was 24,757. Historically, various Nahua peoples have dominated the state. This population severely diminished during the colonial period and again during the Porfiriato (late 19th and early 20th centuries), when many indigenous peasants were sent to other parts of the country to work. Those considered to be ethnically indigenous are located in 33 municipalities with most concentrated in 15 of these. Many identify as Mixtec, Tlapaneco and Zapotec who have immigrated from Puebla, Guerrero, and Oaxaca. Most of those who identify as Nahua are native to the state. Many of the immigrant indigenous are migrant workers, traveling among fields of sugar cane, corn, tomatoes, and onions. Some return to their home states in the off-season and some remain permanently in Morelos.

While indigenous languages have largely disappeared since the Conquest, many old customs and traditions continue to live on as part of many people's identity. Many ethnic Nahuas conserve much of their ancient knowledge, such as dances, music, agricultural practices, and rituals, although most are mixed with Catholic and moderns beliefs and practices. Since Mexico's census only counts the indigenous by language spoken and not by ethnicity, it is not possible to be sure of the precise number of Nahua in Morelos. Between 32 and 35 communities in the state have been identified as being "indigenous" based on prevailing customs and tradition. However, this does not take into account migrant workers or who have immigrated to the state from other parts of Mexico. In 2020, 37,569 people were counted as speaking an indigenous language, with the municipalities of Cuautla, Cuernavaca, Ayala, Puente de Ixtla, Temixco, and Tetela del Volcàn having the highest number of speakers.

Of the eleven municipalities which are classified as highly marginalized economically, only three have a significant indigenous population (Temoac, Miacatlán and Tetela del Volcán). However, within larger municipalities such as Cuernavaca and Jiutepec, indigenous communities tend to be highly marginalized. Coatetelco, Hueyapan, and Xoxocotla were established as autonomous indigenous communities in 2019.

A 2020 genetic study that sampled 112 people from Cuernavaca and rural communities in Morelos found an average of 60.4% Indigenous genetic ancestry and 38.6% European ancestry in the general population of the state.

According to the 2020 Census, 1.94% of Morelos's population identified as Black, Afro-Mexican, or of African descent.

== Government ==
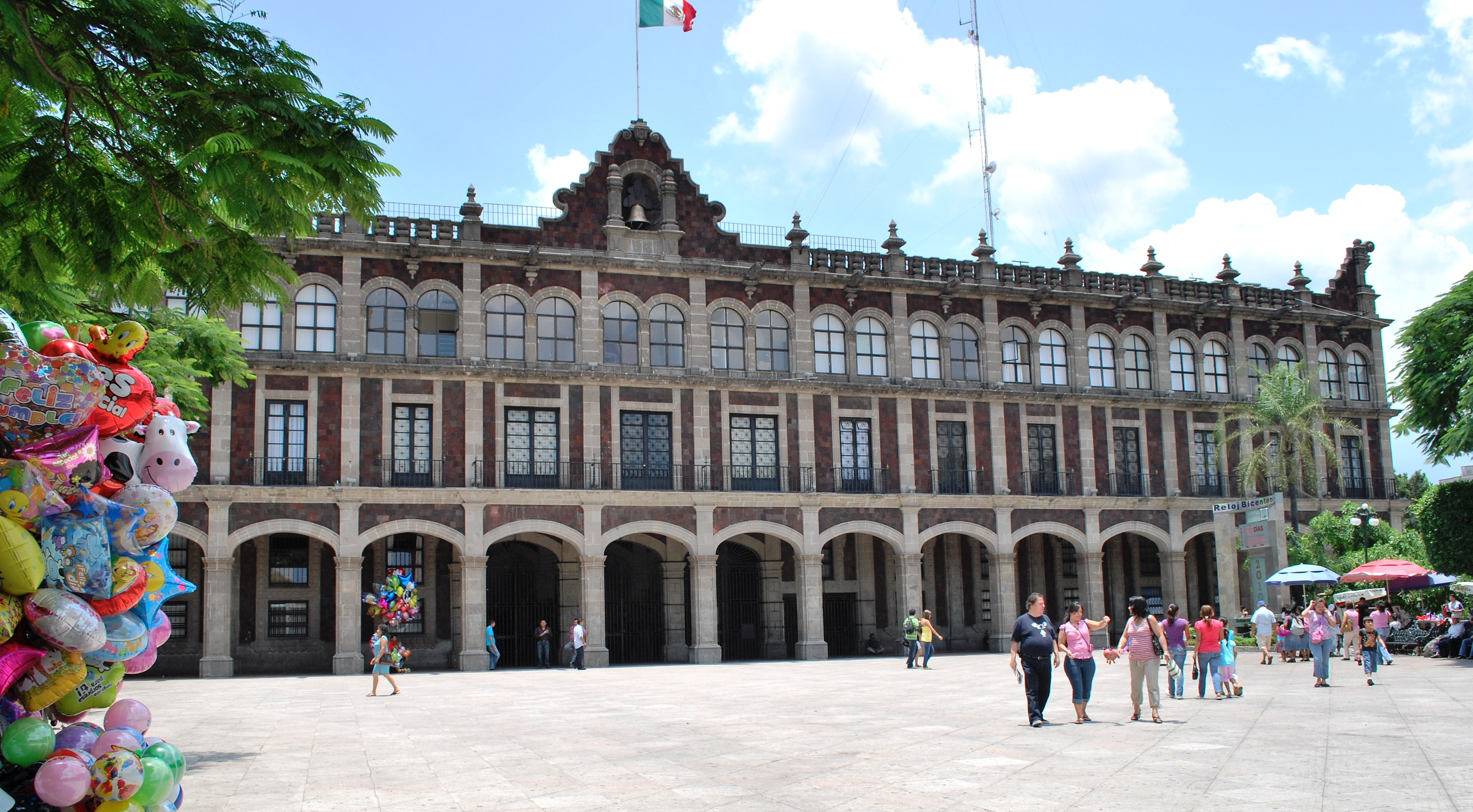
State Government Palace in Cuernavaca

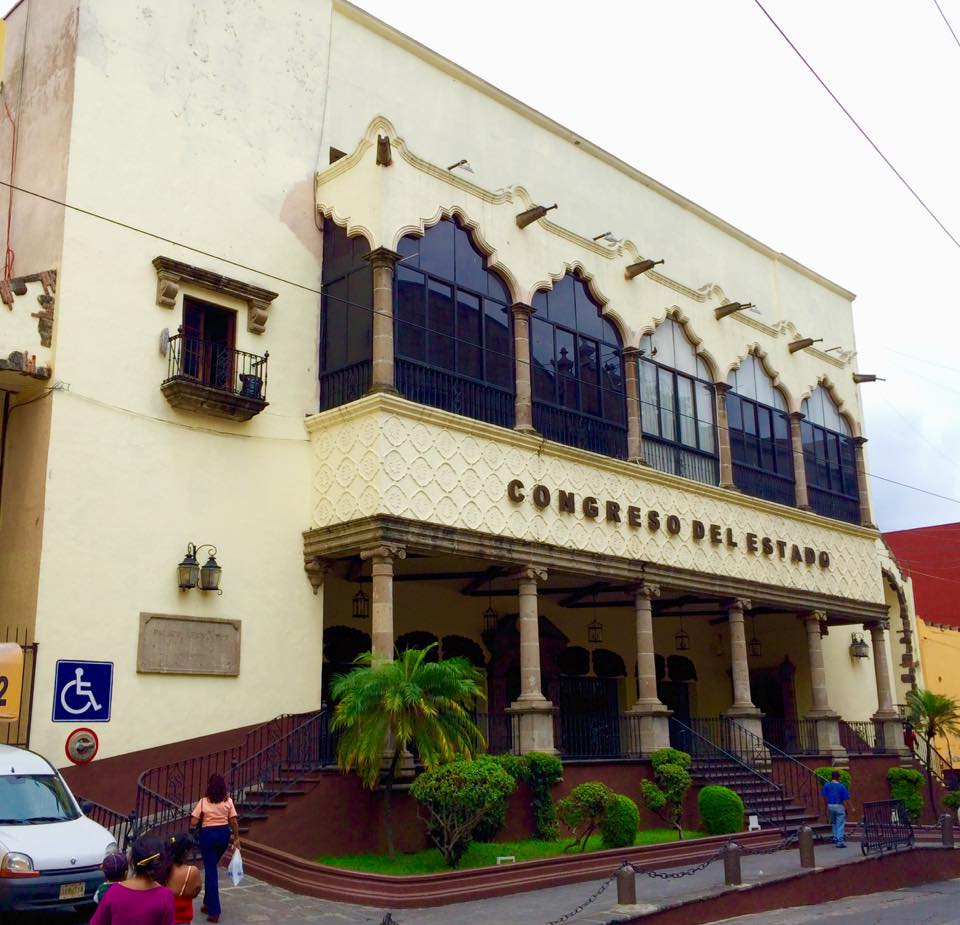
Congressional Building in Cuernavaca

The state is governed by an elected governor, who has a cabinet with four departments called "Policy, Security and Justice," "Human and Social Development," "Sustainable Economic Development" and "Development and Modernization of the Administration.". The Congress of Morelos in is charge of passing laws and revising those already in existence. It is unicameral with twenty "deputies" (diputados) representing twelve districts and eight plurinominales elected by proportion in 2018. The deputies of the 54th legislature are: 1. Alejandra Flores Espinoza (Morena), 2. Javier García Chávez (Morena), 3. José Casas González (PT), 4. Erika García Zaragoza (PT), 5. Andrés Duque Tinoco (PES), 6. Ariadna Barrera Vázquez (Morena), 7. Marcos Zapotitla Becerro (Morena), 8. Elsa Delia González Solórzano (Morena), 9. Keila Celene Figueroa Evaristo (Morena), 10. José Luis Galindo Cortez (PT), 11. Alfonso de Jesús Sotelo Martinez (PES), 12. Maricela Jiménez Armendáriz (PES). Plurinominales: Tania Valentina Rodríguez Ruiz (PT), Rosalina Mazari Espín (PRI), Dalila Morales Sandoval (PAN), Ana Cristina Guevara Ramírez (MC), Blanca Nieves Sánchez Arano (Panal), Naida Josefina Díaz Roca (PSD), Cristina Xochiquetzal Sánchez Ayala (Humanist), and Rosalinda Rodríguez Tinoco (PRD).

The state opened a new legislative palace on 28 February 2018. Located in Amatitlan, Cuernavaca, it occupies 4,394 m^{2} (47,000 ft.^{2}) of construction and was built at a cost of $360 million pesos (US$18.9 million). The building was designed by students of the College of Architecture of the University of Morelos (UAEM).

=== Governors of Morelos ===
Morelos had seven governors between 1869 (when the state was formed) and 1911 (when the Madero Revolution triumphed). Francisco Leyva Arciniegas was the first Constitutional governor (1869–1876).

Thirty-four men held the highest administrative position in Morelos between 1911 and 1930. Their titles included Constitutional Governor, Substitute Governor, Provisional Governor, Temporary Governor, Military Governor, Political head of Territory, and In charge of office. General Genovevo de la O, and José G. Parres Guerrero are the best-known names. Octavio Paz Solórzano, father of the poet Octavio Paz, served briefly in 1925.

Twenty men have served as governor during the Constitutional Period. Vicente Estrada Cajigal (PNR, 1930–1934) was the first Constitutional governor after the Revolution. Felipe Rivera Crespo (PRI, 1970–1976) is remembered for his support of agriculture. Lauro Ortega Martínez (PRI, 1982–1988) is credited with improving the highway of Cañon de Lobos, saving the town of Huautla, and building the Mariano Matamoros soccer stadium. Antonio Riva Palacio López (PRI, 1988–1994) was the last member of PRI to serve a full six-year term as Governor of Morelos. After he completed his term, he was appointed ambassador to Ecuador (1994–1998), despite being accused of literally hundreds of charges of corruption. Jorge Carrillo Olea (PRI, 1994–1998) was forced to resign after being accused of covering for kidnappers. Carrillo was followed by two interim governors, and then Sergio Alberto Estrada Cajigal Ramirez of PAN was elected in 2000. Estrada Cajigal is the grandson of Vicente Estrada Cajigal, first governor elected under the 1930 constitution, and he was the first governor who was not a member of PRI or its predecessor, PNR. The younger Estrada Cajigal is best remembered for the Helicopter of Love bought with government funds for emergency use but actually used to impress his mistresses. His term ended in 2006 and he resigned from PAN in 2009. Marco Antonio Adame (PAN, 2006–2012) followed. Adame's term of office was marked by extreme violence, and he was accused of not only having ties to drug cartels, but also of electoral fraud.

After 70 years of corruption under PRI and eight under PAN, voters turned left and chose Graco Luis Ramírez Garrido Abreu (PRD 2012–2018). However, by 2017, he was called the worst governor in the country, with an 8% approval rating. He was accused of nepotism (his stepson ran for governor in 2018), incompetence (for the high rate of crime in the state and because of a poorly built expressway), and for deviation of funds (bankrupting the state university). Cuauhtémoc Blanco, the Presidente Municipal of Cuernavaca and a former soccer star with Liga MX, most notably with Club América, won with 53.3% of the vote in a six-way race in 2018. Blanco was the nominee of the now-defunct, Christian right Social Encounter Party (PES), which capitalized on Blanco's popularity as a former soccer player to win both the internal election of the Juntos Haremos Historia coalition (spearheaded by National Regeneration Movement's leader, Andrés Manuel López Obrador) for the state's candidacy and, ultimately, the state election. Blanco's term is scheduled to end in 2024.

=== Political divisions of state ===
Morelos is currently subdivided into 36 municipios (municipalities). On 9 November 2017, the state legislature approved the creation of three Indigenous municipalities, which took effect on 1 January 2019.

The major communities of Morelos are Cuernavaca (population 366,321; altitude 1,510 m (4,950 ft), Jiutepec (population 214,137; altitude 1,355 m (4,446 ft), Cuautla (population 194,786, altitude 1,304 m (4,278 ft), Temixco (population 116,143, altitude 1,269 m (4,163 ft), Emiliano Zapata (population 99,493, altitude 1,213 m (3,980 ft), Ayala (population 85,521, altitude 1,147 m (3,763 ft), Xochitepec (population 68,984, altitude 1,112 m (3,648 ft), Puente de Ixtla population 66,435, altitude 897 m (2,943 ft), Jojutla (population 57,121, altitude 882 m (2,894 ft), and Yecapixtla (population 52,651, altitude 1,580 m (5,180 ft).

== Economy and tourism ==
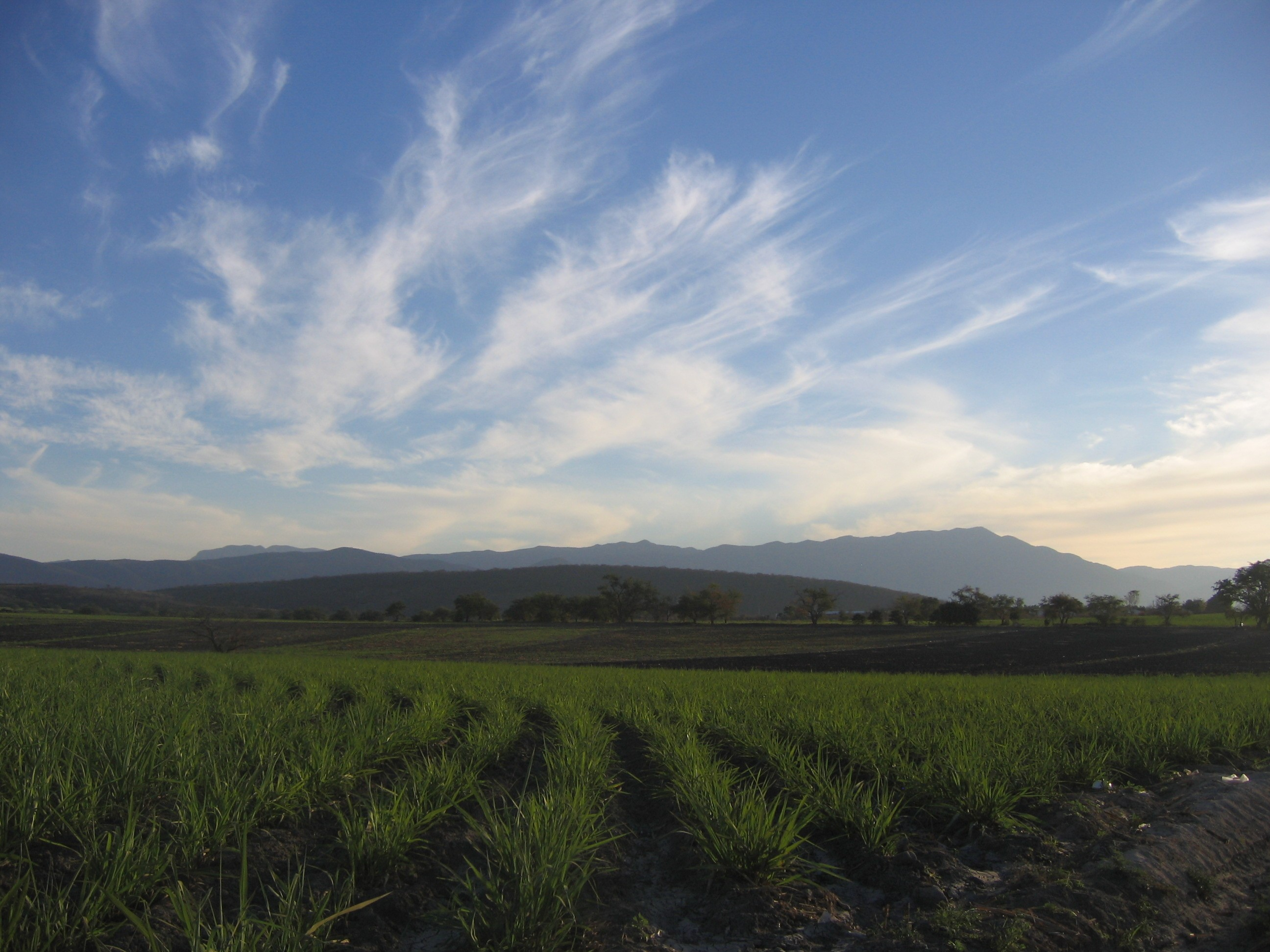
Field in Jojutla

The economy of Morelos is based on agriculture, tourism, and urbanization. Since the 1960s, the economy has been shifting from agriculture to industry and commerce. However, most of these shifts have occurred on a small scale and a number of municipalities are still almost completely reliant on agriculture. While the state provides just 1.6% of the country's GDP, its economy is strong enough to attract workers, especially farm workers from other areas of the country. However, a large percentage of the state's population works six days a week, receiving wages of only 500 to 700 Mexican pesos ($46–$65USD), despite the fact that Morelos is one of the more expensive states to live in.

Economically, the state divides into seven districts. The Cuernavaca Region includes the municipalities of Cuernavaca, Temixco, Emiliano Zapata, Jiutepec, and Xochitepec. The North Region includes the municipalities of Huitzilac, Tepoztlán, Tlalnepantla, and Totolapan. The Cuautla Region includes the municipalities of Atlatlahucan, Ayala, Cuautla, Tlayacapan, Yautepec de Zaragoza, and Yecapixtla. The Northeast Region includes Ocuituco, Temoac, Tetela del Volcán, and Zacualpan de Amilpas. The Southeast Region includes Axochiapan, Jantetelco, Jonacatepec and Tepalcingo. The South Region includes Amacuzac, Jojutla, Puente de Ixtla, Tlaltizapán, Tlaquiltenango, and Zacatepec de Hidalgo; and the Western Region includes Coatlán del Río, Mazatepec, Miacatlán and Tetecala.

In 2003, Morelos was one of the first states to take advantage of a new law allowing states to sell bonds. In 2002, the state sold $24 million USD worth of bonds on the Mexican stock market in order to finance highways, schools, waterworks and other infrastructure projects. The bond sales also allowed the state to access lower-interest long-term financing.

Due to its location near Mexico City, the state has one of the lower rates of economic marginalization, ranking 20th of 33 units in economic marginalization, based on housing and education. The most urbanized areas of the state are the strongest economically, with the least urbanized being the poorest. Two of the factors in the development of the state's economy since the 1960s are the opening of the Mexico City-Acapulco highway through the state in 1952 and the creation of the Civac (Ciudad Industrial Valle de Cuernavaca) industrial complex in 1965. This concentrated the population growth into the northern part of the state. Eleven of the state's 36 municipalities are considered to have a serious degree of marginalization: Tlalnepantla, Totolapan, Tlayacapan, Tetela del Volcán, Ocuituco, Zaculapan, Temoac, Tepalcingo, Amacuzac, Coatlán del Río, Miacatlán and some parts of Puente de Ixtla.

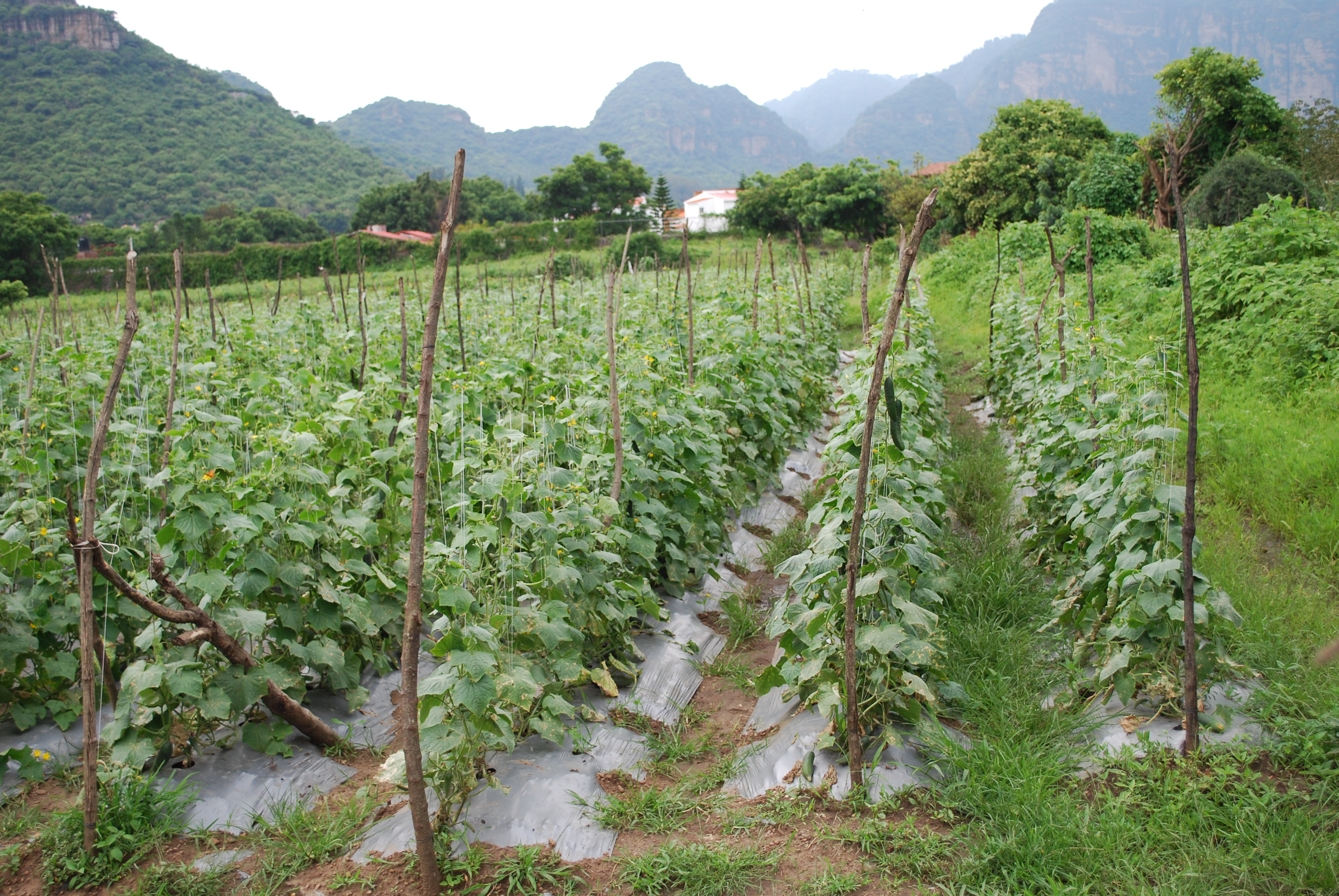
Cucumber field in Tlayacapan

Since the 1980s, the agricultural sector of the economy has been steadily shrinking but it remains an important part of the state's economy, as there are still a significant number of communities that rely on it. Just under 20% of the working population of the state is involved in farming, ranching, fish farming or forestry. Land available for human exploitation outside of populated areas is divided between agriculture/grazing (45%) and forestry (55%). Agricultural and forestry lands are further subdivided by climate and the type of forest (conifer vs. rainforest). Roughly 70% of the state has a subtropical climate, providing ideal conditions for agriculture, in particular sugar cane, and most farming is done in the warmer areas. Sugar cane has been an important crop since colonial times and still is important today, although the percentage of land dedicated to it has decreased since the 1960s. Another important crop is rice. The production of rice in the state has fallen drastically, from a height of 100,000 tons annually to only 21,000 tons due to the reduction in cultivation areas and the high costs of production. The state still ranks sixth in its production. However, despite price and market protections, foreign rice is competing with rice produced in the state. Sorghum has replaced lost yields of sugar cane and rice to a certain extent, which has been encouraged by the government. One way the state tries to sell its more expensive products such as rice has been the registration of a trademark calledTradición Agrícola de Morelos (Morelos Agricultural Tradition) to identify products produced in the state on store shelves.

Another important cash and export crop is fresh flowers and ornamental plants. In 2003, this sector accounted for 27 million dollars of income to the state, up from 20 million in 2000. Morelos is Mexico's major producers of roses, producing 54,552 dozens in 2002. Morelos claims to be the native location of the poinsettia, called noche buena in Spanish. It is native to Mexico, but there has been a "diplomatic patent" on the plant since the early 19th century when the first US ambassador to Mexico, Joel Roberts Poinsett, registered it. The state's historical society has asked the secretary of the interior to review treaties and work to have this patent annulled. As it stands now, Mexican poinsettia growers must pay royalty fees to the U.S. and even import cuttings from authorized growers in the U.S. to grow the plant commercially. Another effort to combat the patent is to develop a new variety of the flower that would not be covered.

Along with corn and beans are grown for subsistence, other fruits and vegetables are widely grown. These include bananas, cherimoyas, mameys, melons, cucumbers, tomatillos, jicama, squash, alfalfa, cotton, peanuts, onions and tomatoes. Many crops are grown for self-consumption, especially in indigenous areas. The state is working to help shift agriculture production from traditional corn and beans, which can be imported cheaper, to other products such as apricots, which have been shown to make money. Livestock mostly consists of cattle, pigs, horses, and domestic fowl. There is some fish farming in the state, mostly of mojarra and tilapia in Rodeo and Zacatepec.

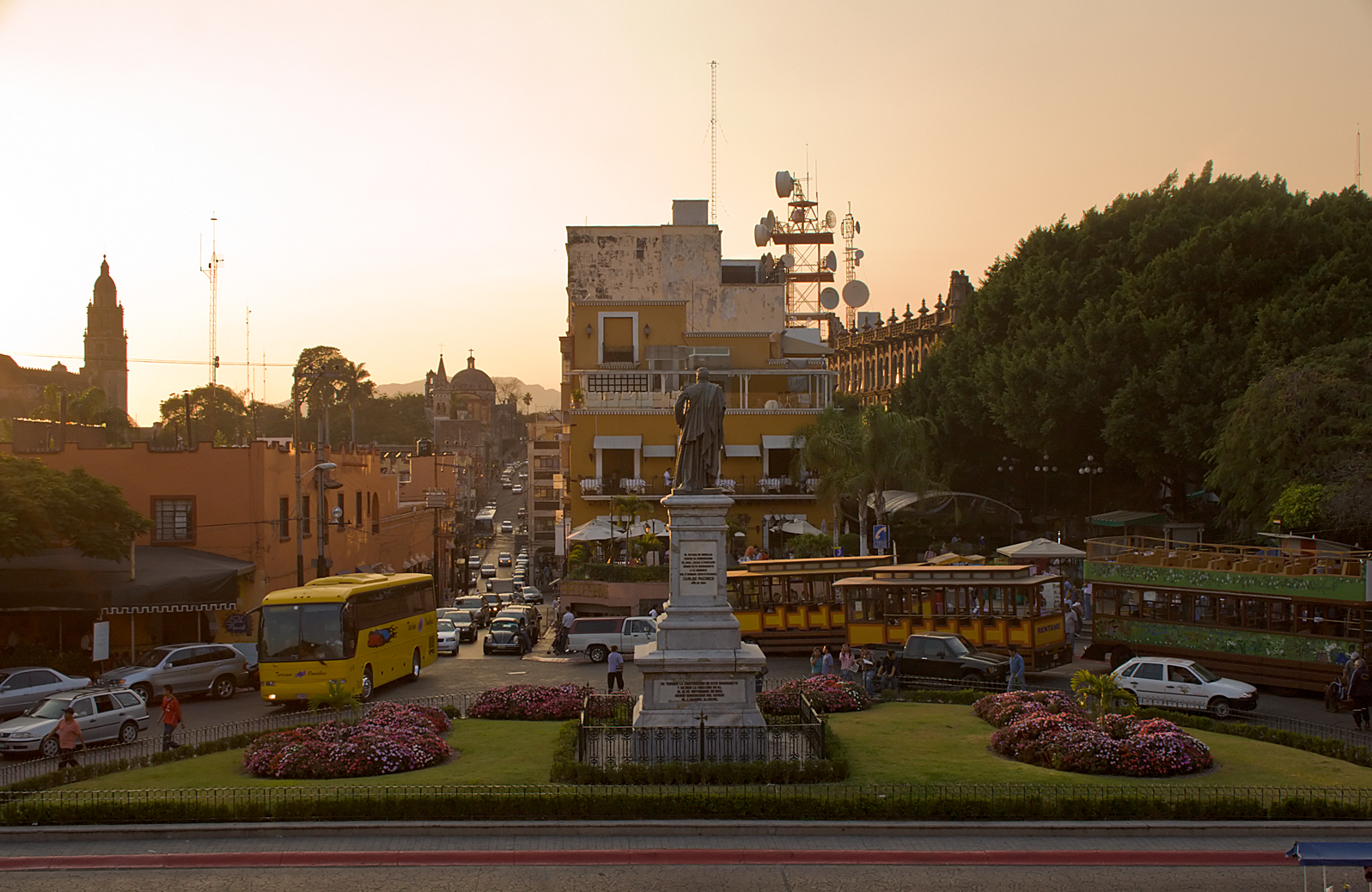
Cuernavaca city

Industry, mining, and construction accounts for 29% of the state's GDP and employs 27% of the working population. Food processing (especially sugar came, rice, sorghum and grains) represents an important industry.

Goods produced include automobiles and auto parts, textiles, pharmaceuticals, metal products, agro-industry, ceramics, and handcrafted items. Most exports go to the United States, Canada, Japan and the European Union. In the early 2000s, the state attracted a number of foreign enterprises to build industrial facilities here, includes car parts such as windshields.

There are two major industrial parks in the state, Ciudad Industrial del Valle de Cuernavaca (CIVAC) and Parque Industrial de Cuautla (PINC). CIVAC is located in the municipality of Jiutepec. It was created in 1966 and is considered to be the most important economic development in the state. Today the park is home to 108 businesses, 35% of which are transnational. The Parque Industrial de Cuautla is located outside of the city. It occupies 113 hectares, with about 40% of this available. The industrial park suffered major fire damage in 2007. In 2009, the government intervened with plans to revive the park and improve its infrastructure with a budget of 240 million pesos.

The Desarrollo Industrial Emiliano Zapata is the newest park, located just outside Cuernavaca in the municipality of Emiliano Zapata. It has an extension of 23.5 hectares. One of its principal occupants is the Nu Start clothing manufacturer. Another is the Emiliano Zapata Central de Abastos (wholesale food market).

Commerce, transportation, services, and tourism accounts for 59% of the state's GDP and employs just over 50% of the working population. The growth of the commerce sector is due to urbanization and the growth of tourism. The biggest selling point of the state touristically is its location, just south of Mexico City, which has the largest and wealthiest population in the country. Many of these people come to spend the weekend in Cuernavaca's nightclubs and away from Mexico City's traffic and pollution. Many of these visitors have bought second homes here, which has driven property prices up. Those from Mexico City and other cities are also attracted to the states water parks and spas, such as Las Palmas in Tehuixtla, El Rollo and the Parque Acuatico Oaxtepec.

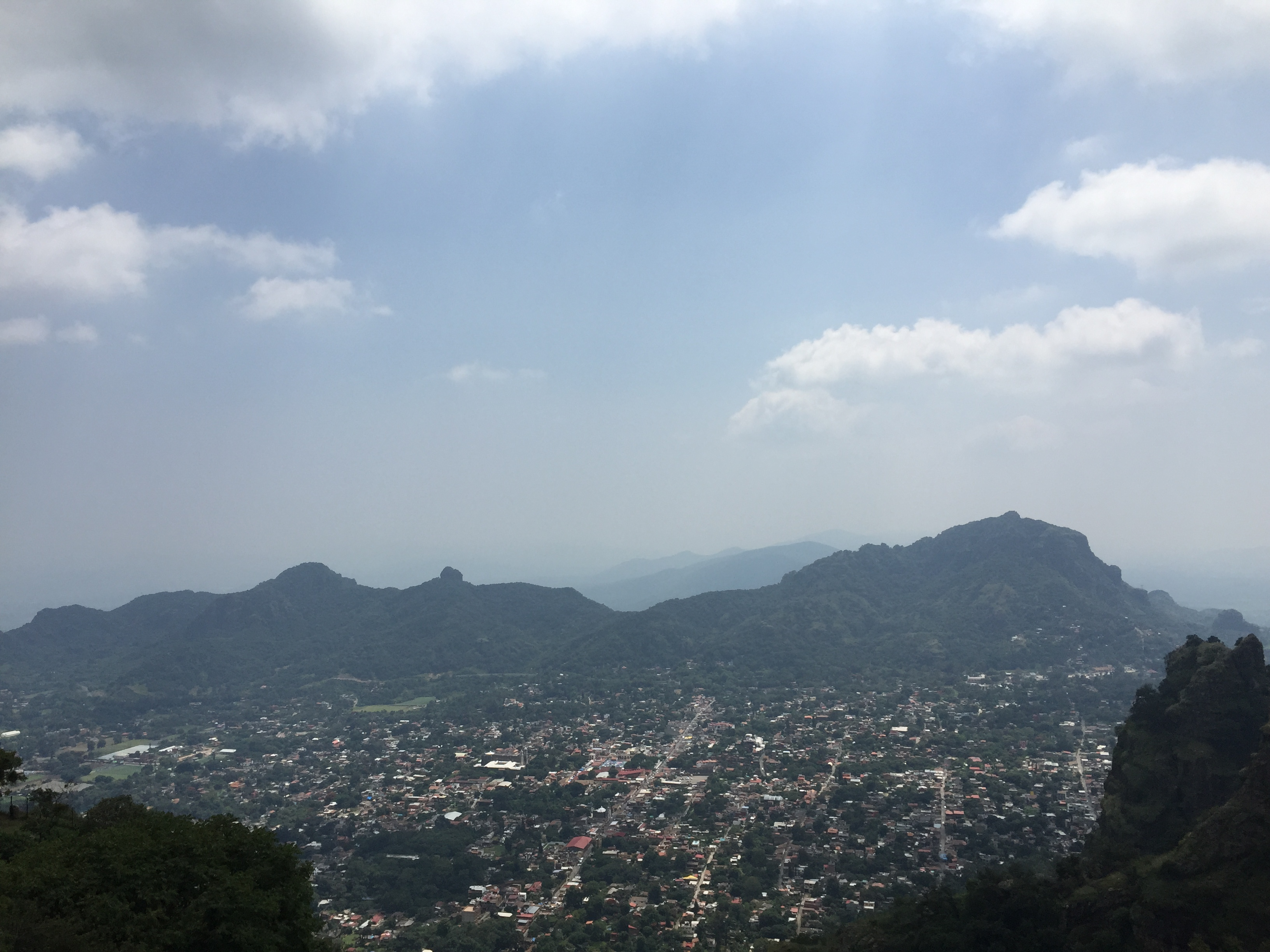
Panoramic view of Tepoztlán

The state, especially around the capital of Cuernavaca, has experienced a housing boom since the late 1990s. More than 10,000 houses were built from 2000 to 2008 and another 50,000 are planned through 2013. The state's office of urban development states that this is far above what is needed to house the state's population. Instead, it reflects demand from Mexico City for a weekend and getaway homes. The housing boom has put a strain on infrastructure and on property prices.

=== Tourism ===
The secretary of tourism for the state promotes the cities of Cuernavaca and Cuautla; the Magic Towns of Tepoztlán and Tlayacapan; the archaeological site of Xochicalco; and Lake Tequesquitengo.

As the center of the state's history and culture, the city of Cuernavaca has landmarks and attractions such as the Palacio de Cortés, where Hernán Cortés centered his enterprises of the Marquesado del Valle de Oaxaca, and now the site of the mural called History of Morelos, Conquest and Revolution by Diego Rivera; the Morelos and Juárez Gardens, the Cuernavaca Cathedral, and the Borda Garden. The city has several other museums and colonial-era churches, as well as a large variety of hotels and restaurants, including the world-renowned Las Mañanitas. The various Spanish language schools in Cuernavaca also attract foreign students, many from the United States.

Tepoztlán is a "New Age" town famous for its crafts market and its "revitalizing energy." The pyramid of El Tepozteco, dedicated to the god of pulque, is located at the summit of a hill and requires a two-hour climb for a majestic view of the valley below. Tepoztlan was named a "Pueblo Mágico" in 2002. It is home to one of the Monasteries on the slopes of Popocatépetl, a World Heritage Site. Hiking and camping are popular in the area, and the town boasts two large campgrounds—Camohmila, owned by the YMCA, and Meztitla, owned by the Scouts of Mexico (ASMAC). Tepoztlán's pre-Lenten Carnaval is the largest and best known in the state.

Tlayacapan is located in the northeast part of the state, just south of Mexico City. It is a rural area, with a way of life that has not changed much over the 20th century. Ninety percent of its population is still partially or fully dependent on agriculture. The town has old mansions, houses with red tile roofs and streets paved with stones. Many ravines crisscross the area and are crossed by numerous stone bridges. It is also home to the San Juan Bautista Monastery and 26 chapels built in the colonial era. Tlayacapan produces unique black pottery.

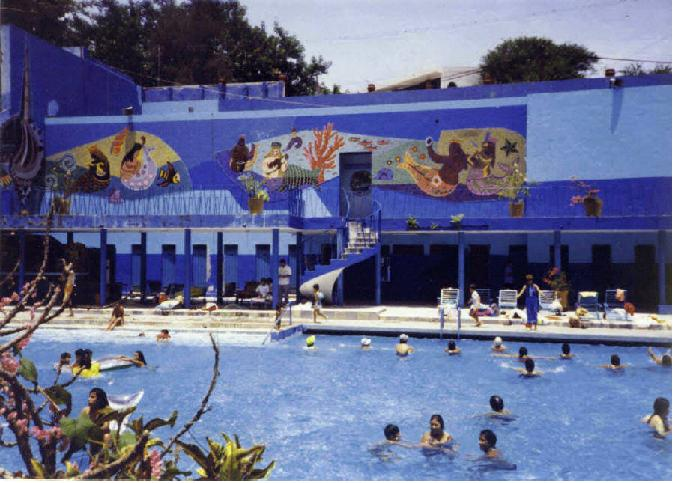
View of Agua Hedionda

Cuautla is the third-largest city in the state and was the site of one of the early major battles of the Mexican War of Independence and later the Battle of Cuautla during the Mexican Revolution. The center of the town is home to the Municipal Palace and the Santo Domingo Church. One major attraction is the Morelos House, where José María Morelos y Pavón lived during the 1812 siege of the city. Near the city are various spas and water parks such as the Agua Hedionda, famous for its sulfur-laden waters.

Lake Tequesquitengo (Laguna de Tequesquitengo), which many claim was created when the area was flooded by damming the local river, is located 45 km south of Cuernavaca in the Municipio of Jojutla. The lake is 3 km by 4.5 km and is used by visitors for watersports, including water-skiing, scuba diving, and fishing; as well as for weekend getaways. Also near Jojutla, you can find the ex-hacienda of Vista Hermosa, now a hotel and restaurant. Jardines de Mexico, the largest floral park in the world, is also close, and there are several water parks in the region.

==== History ====
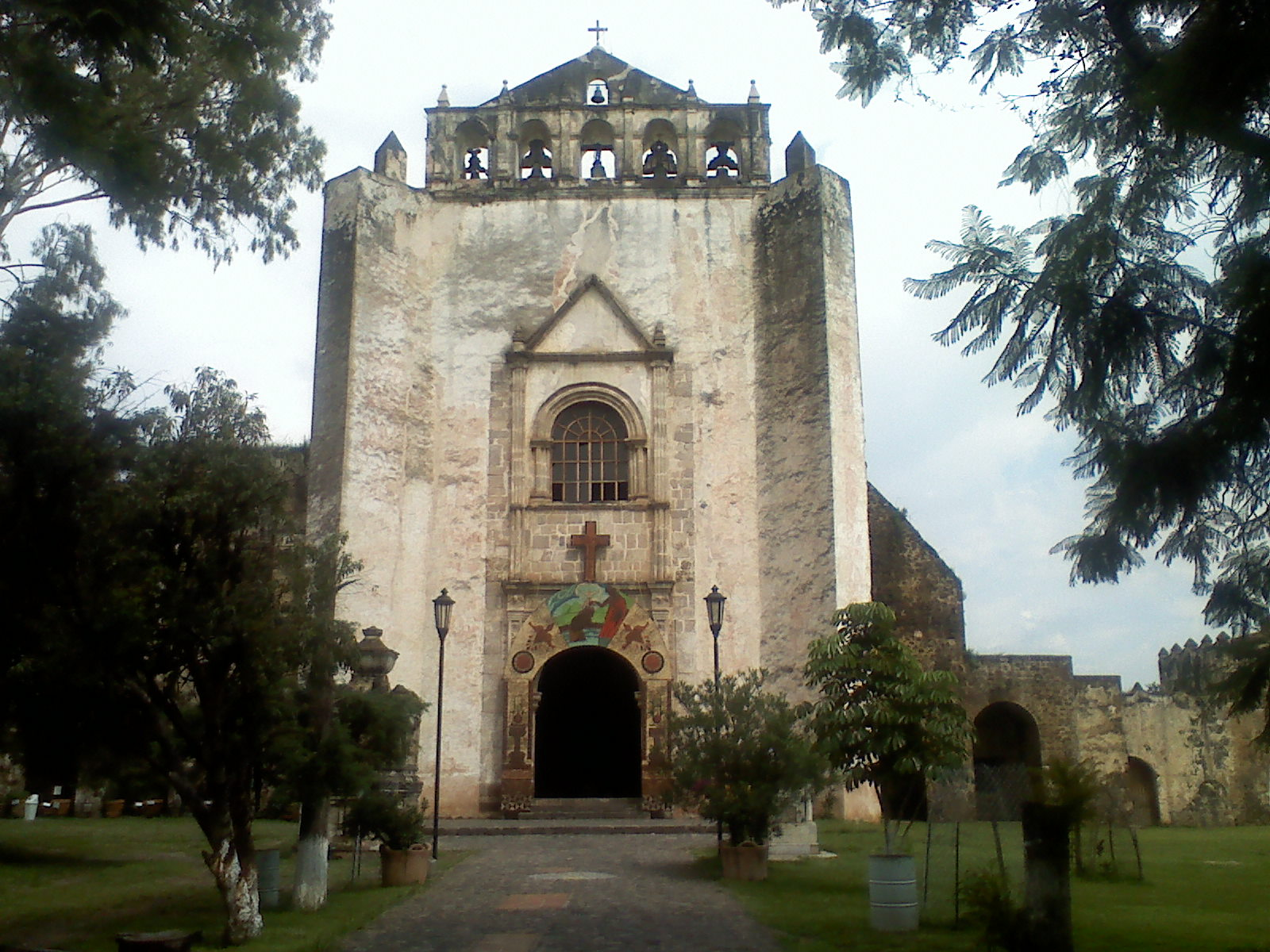
Monastery of San Juan Bautista in Tlayacapan

History buffs may want to start at the Cuauhnáhuac Regional Museum (a.k.a. Palace of Cortes, which has exhibited about the history of the state, from the time of the earliest inhabitants, the Colonial era, the Mexican Revolution and beyond.[150] The museum includes the Diego Rivera mural, History of Morelos, Conquest and Revolution.

The state has a number of archeological sites. The most important are Chalcatzingo, an Olmec settlement from 750 to 500 BCE located in Jantetelco; Zazacatla from the same era and located in Xochitepec; Coatetelco from 500 to 150 BCE, located in the municipality of that same name. Xochicalco is the largest and most important archaeological site in the state. Located in the municipalities of Miacatlan and Temixco, this was a fortified trading center that may have been built by refugees from Teotihuacan from AD 700-900 (designated as a World Heritage Site). Its best-known structures are the Temple of Quetzalcoatl and its observatory. Xochicalco is probably the location of 'Tamoanchan' as described by Bishop Francisco Plancarte y Navarrete. Teopanzolco in Cuernavaca was a ceremonial center of the Tlahuicas. The most important temple is the Twin Temples (Templos Gemelos), which may have been a model for the Templo Mayor in Mexico City. This site was unknown until the 1914 Siege of Cuernavaca during the Mexican Revolution. Popular with tourists is El Tepozteco located on the Sierra de Tepoztlan.

While Morelos was key to the 1521 conquest of Tenochtitlan, there are no vestiges of the battles to be found in the state. The Ruta de los Conventos or Ruta de los Volcanos established by the state tourism agency, takes one from Cuernavaca to Tepoztlan, Oaxtepec, Tlayacapan, Totolapan, Yecapixtla, Ocuituc, Tetela del Volcán, and Zacualpan de Amilpas. These monasteries plus those in Atlatlahuacán and Hueyapán are included in the Monasteries on the slopes of Popocatépetl World Heritage site. This area also has varying landscapes, a wide variety of flora and fauna as well as churches, former haciendas, archeological sites and ruins. Civilian monuments from the Colonial era include the aforementioned Palace of Cortes and Borda Garden in Cuernavaca, as well as the many sugar cane 'haciendas' (estates or plantations) and aqueducts found throughout the state. Cuautla was the site of an important battle during the Mexican War of Independence, led by Jose Maria de Morelos. There is a museum dedicated to Morelos there, and one can visit other sites related to the siege of the city. There is a small museum dedicated to his right-hand man, Father Mariano Matamoros, in Jantetelco.

The train stations of Cuautla and Cuernavaca both date from the 19th century. The former is now a museum while the latter is a dance academy. Also in Cuernavaca is the Porfirio Diaz bridge.

The Ruta de Zapata (Zapata Route) covers the areas General Emiliano Zapata operated throughout the state of Morelos during the Mexican Revolution. Begin in Cuautla and travel through history, since the streets are named after the moments that were lived during the struggles for independence and the Mexican Revolution. A few blocks from the zócalo is the statue and burial site of Zapata. The route continues to Ciudad Ayala, the cradle of the Revolution in Morelos. Follow the tour of Tlaltizapan, where Zapata established his headquarters. Then go to Yautepec, where you can see the hull of the Hacienda de Atlihuayan, which is private but was the place that minted the coins used by the Zapatistas.

==== Outdoor recreation ====
The year-round warm climate of Morelos makes outdoor sports easily accessible.

There are dozens of waterparks, including natural waterparks (some with hot springs); world-class adventure parks; and small, rustic waterparks. Six Flags Hurricane Harbor, in Oaxtepec, is located in the eastern part of the state. The area has been used as a swimming resort since the time of Aztec tlotoni (emperor) Moctezuma II. Las Estacas in Tlaltizapan is built around a crystal-clear river surrounded by lush vegetation. A small museum dedicated to Revolutionary War General Emiliano Zapata is nearby. El Rollo in Tlalquitenango, Jojutla is located fifty minutes south of Cuernavaca. It covers an area of 30 hectares and is one of the largest water parks in Latin America. Ex-Hacienda de Temixco is located 10 minutes south of Cuernavaca in the town of Temixco. This park is built on the site of a 16th-century sugar-cane plantation which was appropriated during the Mexican Revolution.

Water-skiing is popular at Lake Tequesquitengo and Acuaski. Scuba and snorkeling are popular at Las Estacas and at Lake Tequesquitengo. White-water rafting is available on the Amacuzac River.

Hiking is done primarily along the Corredor Biológico Ajusco Chichinautzin in the mountainous regions of Huitzilac, Tepoztlan, and Tlayacapan. Many waterparks allow camping, and both the YMCA and the Scouts of Mexico operate large campgrounds in Tepoztlan. Rock climbing and rappel are popular at the Scout camp in Meztitla and elsewhere, such as Lagunas de Zempoala National Park. There isn't really much mountain climbing in Morelos, and it is illegal to climb Popocatepetl since the volcano is active.

Bicycling might be done by following the former rail line from Mexico City to Cuernavaca. There are dozens of bicycle routes in Cuernavaca and Tepoztlan. Cuernavaca bike routsTepoztlan bike routes

==== Zoos and wildlife sanctuaries ====
Zoológico Zoofari is a Safari Park in Amacuzac located at Km 55 of the Cuernavaca-Taxco highway. Opened in May 1984, Zoofari has 130 species and 1200 animals on exhibit, including zebras, ostriches, antelopes, lions, elephants, rhinos, and giraffes. The zoo is divided into six sections, five of which can be visited by car. There is a zip line, a restaurant, and a gift shop. Visitors can have their pictures taken with animal cubs and can ride dromedaries, llamas, and ponies.

There is a small petting zoo, a butterfly sanctuary, and a Herpetario (Reptile House) at the Parque Ecológico Chapultepec in Cuernavaca. There is a butterfly sanctuary at Jardines de México in Jojutla. There is a turtle sanctuary in Cuautla.

Visitors can ride horses or ponies at Lagunas de Zempoala National Park in Huitzilac. Kite flying and hiking are also popular there.

== Culture ==
Culturally, the state divides into four sections. Zona Norte is linked to the Valley of Mexico and includes the municipalities of Cuernavaca, Tepoztlán, Tlalnepantla, Totolapan, Atlatlahucan, Yecapixtla, Ocuituco and Tetela del Volcán. Zona Oriente is linked to Puebla and includes the municipalities of Zacualpan de Amilpas, Jantetelco, Jonacatepec and Axochiapan. Zona Sur Oeste includes the municipalities of Tlaquiltenango, Jojutla, Zacatepec, Puente de Ixtla, Amacuzac, Coatlán del Río, Tetecala, Mazatepec and Miacatlán. Zona Centro includes the municipalities of Temixco, Yautepec, Jiutepec, Emiliano Zapata, Ayala, Tlaltizapan and Axochiapan.

=== Cuisine ===
Nouvelle Mexican offerings include huitlacoche (corn smut) fondue, salmon in adobo and game hen in peanut mole. In addition to the more famous restaurants, Cuernavaca has its share of mom-and-pop eateries, which feature a good variety of enchiladas with various fillings and sauces, and local specialties like rabbit in ancho chile adobo and chicken in peach sauce. The latter is a very characteristic dish of the region since it combines chicken with fruit, of which Morelos has seemingly endless varieties. The taco acorazado, consisting of two large tortillas, rice, and beef or chicken, is the most typical food of Cuernavaca. Tacos al pastor, which is marinated pork slowly cooked by a gas flame on a vertical rotisserie and served on small tortillas, is also popular in the area.

Travelers from Mexico City to Cuernavaca often stop in Tres Marias, located in the Municipio of Huitzilac. The town is located about halfway between the two cities, at an altitude of 2,814 meters. The town is known for its quesadillas, mushroom soup, gordas with whey, and longaniza with chile sauce.

Yecapixtla, located in the eastern part of the state north of Cuautla, is famous for its cecina, or salted beef, which is usually served with fresh cream. Jantetelco is known for crystallized fruit, while Alpuyeca in the west is famous for its ice cream.

Tepoztēcatl, the Aztec god who is said to have created pulque, a drink made from fermented maguey, was born in Amatlan, Tepoztlán; most pulque produced in Morelos comes from the municipality of Huitzilac today. Mezcal and several craft beers are produced in Morelos.

=== Theater, movies, television ===
Many famous Mexican and American actors have (or have had) homes in Morelos, but the state does not have much of a theater tradition. The Teatro Ocampo in Cuernavaca is one of the few places which has a live theater.

Students who wish to study acting can attend the state university UAEM, the Centro de Bellas Artes, or Escuela Laboratorio de Teatro La Rueca Hacienda Tetala, Cuernavaca.

Numerous scenes from television and movies have been filmed in Morelos, including: Second Chance, 1953; Vera Cruz, 1954; The Magnificent Seven, 1960 (Tlyacapan); Butch Cassidy and the Sundance Kid, 1969 (Tlayacapan); Two Mules for Sister Sarah, 1970 (Tlayacapan); Rio Lobo, 1970 (Cuernavaca); Under the Volcano (1984 film), 1984 (Yautepec, Cuautla, and Cuernavaca); Clear and Present Danger, 1994 (Cuernavaca); Vantage Point, 2008 (Cuernavaca); and A Dying King: The Shah of Iran (documentary), 2017 (Cuernavaca).

=== Music, dance, and Carnaval ===
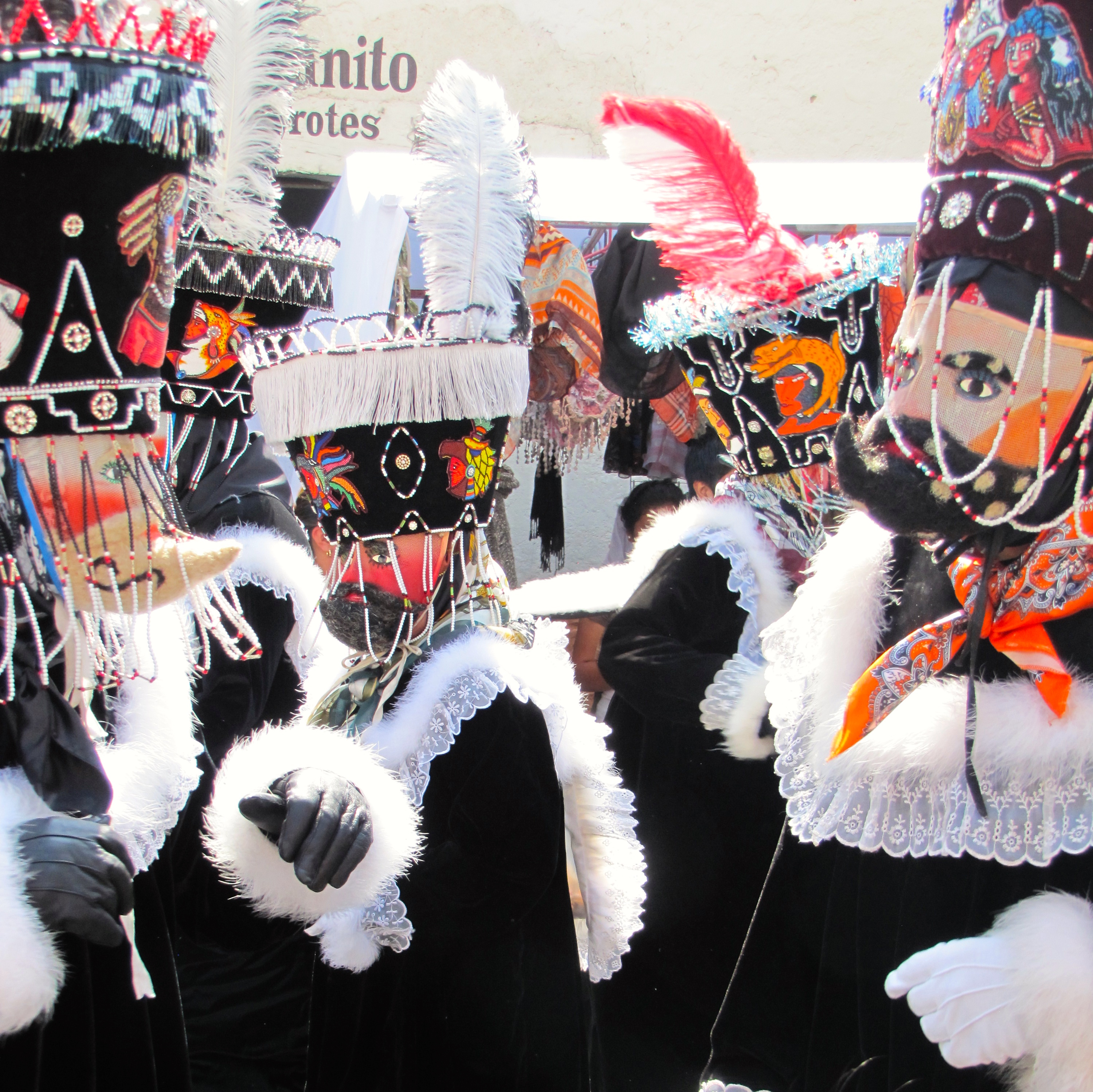
Chinelos

Most of the state's traditional music is associated with corridos. The corrido is sung and played in many parts of Mexico. Those performed in Morelos belong to the "sureño" (southern) type, which can be complicated but, unlike the northern version, is not meant for dancing. The lyrics of this type of corrido generally have eight syllables per line forming stanzas of five verses each. This type of corrido dates back before the Mexican Revolution, but the tradition has waned. One band noted for saving traditional melodies and songs is the Banda Tlayacapan, based in Tlayacapan in the north of the state. This band was formed in 1870 and is the state's oldest band organization. In popular music, the best-known composer from the state is Arturo Márquez, who was born in Samosa, Sonora, but has lived in Cuernavaca for a long time. He is known for his danzones.

One tradition that is identified with the state of Morelos is the Dance of the Chinelos. The dance is popular on many occasions but especially during Carnaval (English: Carnival). The origin of the dance or tradition is not known. One story dates the origin to 1870 when a group of youths decided to dress in old clothes, covering their faces in cloth to shout and jump around in the streets. Other stories place the origin in the colonial past, either as a syncretism between Spanish and indigenous dances, or as a protest or mockery of the indigenous' Spanish overlords. However, it has clearly been identified as originating in Tlayacapan and later spreading to various parts of Morelos, Puebla, and Mexico City.

Today, the Chinelo is a symbol of the identity of the state. Although Chinelos are most frequently found in Tepoztlán, Chinelos groups exist in many communities such as Yautepec, Oacalco, Cualtlixco, Atlahuahuacàn, Oaxtepec, Jojutla, and Totolapan. They can also be found in certain parts of Puebla. The Chinelos dance in groups near each other. Each dancer has his or her own style that has been developed since childhood.

Although not as well known as the Carnaval of Veracruz, a number of communities in the state hold Carnival celebrations in the days leading up to Ash Wednesday. These include Jiutepec, Tlaltizapán, Emiliano Zapata, Tepoztlán, Tlayacapan, Yautepec, and Xochitepec. What distinguishes carnivals in Morelos from others in Mexico is the participation of the Chinelos and bands with wind instruments. In Tepotzlan on a Sunday before Ash Wednesday, the traditional tianguis market is cleared away from the main square and hundreds of multicolored stands move onto the streets in order to make way for Carnival. The street stands mostly specialize in items needed to enjoy the event. Chinelo dancers dominate the event, many in costumes which have been very expensive to assemble. Other events during Carnival there are processions, including the principal one in which there are representatives of all the communities of the municipality. The events last from Sunday to midnight Tuesday, signaling the beginning of Ash Wednesday and Lent. Each day, the Chinelos dance more energetically than the last.

=== Art and literature ===
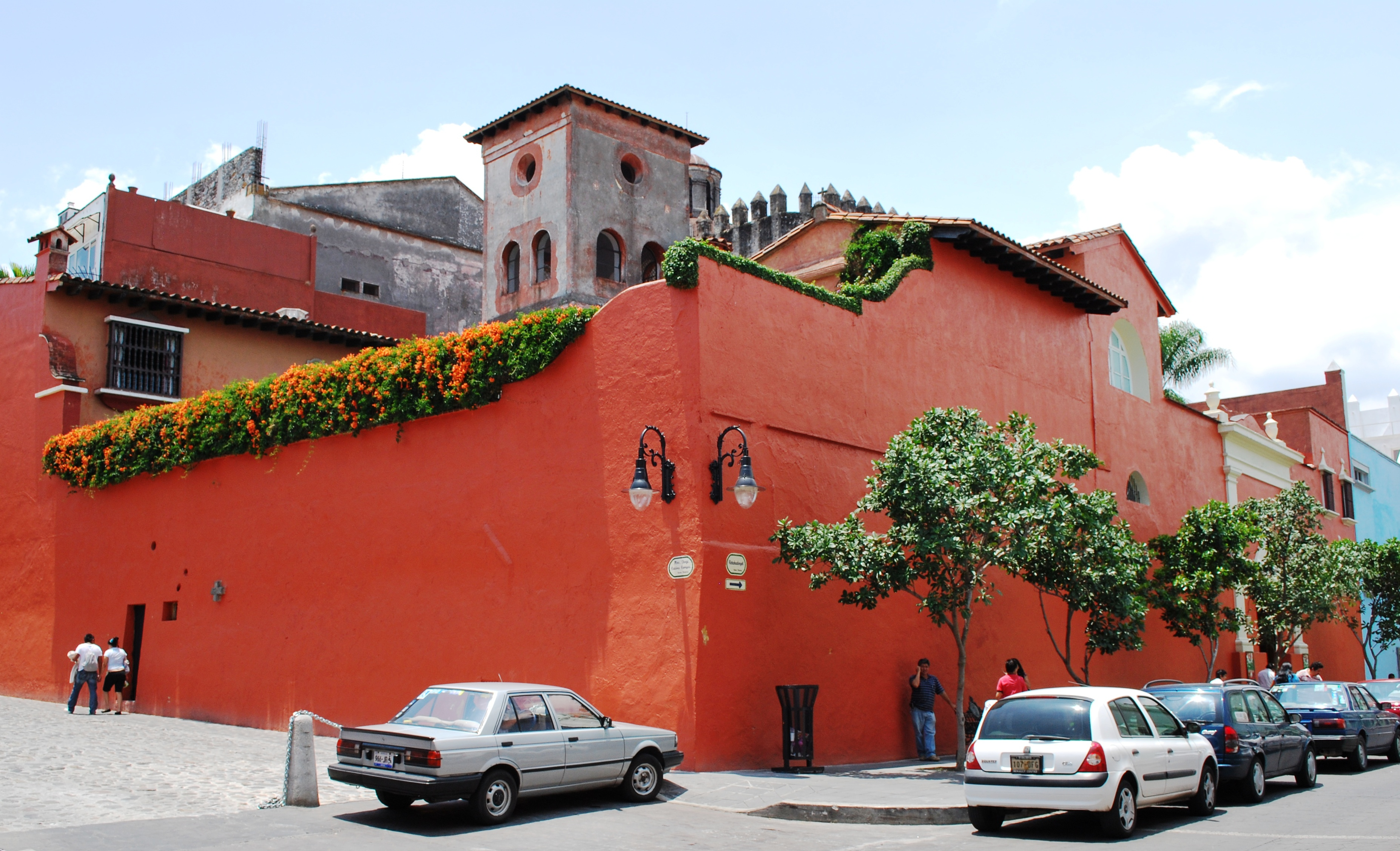
Exterior of the Robert Brady Museum in Cuernavaca, known for its collection of handcrafts and folk art

Most of the state's art scene dates from the 20th century. After the Mexican Revolution, and partly because of state's role in it, a number of muralists came to the state and painted works with social themes in places such as the Palacio de Cortés and the Museo de la Tallera Siqueiros. Cuernavaca has several art museums:

- The Robert Brady Museum of folk art, which is located in the Centro Historico (Historical Center) of the city, around the corner from the cathedral. Brady was an heir of the Mayflower moving company in the U.S. and an art collector.
- The Museo Morelense de Arte Contemporáneo Juan Soriano (MMAC) is a project by JSa Arquitectura led by the architect Javier Sánchez Corral. Its location links Amatitlán, an emblematic town of Cuernavaca whose origins date back 1500 years, to the Historic Center of Cuernavaca, enriching the urban experience. It is the largest exhibition space in the state of Morelos, distributed in two galleries for temporary exhibitions: Central Gallery and Cube, in addition to an Open Forum, a multidisciplinary space. The museum includes a library, a sculptural garden, and workshops for public programs.

Public art includes the mural on the library of Parque Alameda Solidaridad Luis Donaldo Colosio Murrieta, in Cuernavaca. The mural depicts the history of the state. In addition, there is a large fountain that resembles a pre-Hispanic ball field. Also, at the entrance to the Fraccionamiento Lomas de Cuernavaca in the municipality of Temixco, just outside Cuernavaca, is the Glorieta de La Luna with Venetian mosaic by José García Narezo. Along the main street, Paseo de la Reforma, there are numerous shapes covered with ceramic tiles in the Gaudí style, with diverse representations, including the stars, dragons, and signs of the Zodiac. These are popularly called Las Bolas, (the balls), and are a favorite play area for children. In the 1960s, Rosell built the Fuente de las mariposas, (Butterfly Fountain) at the entrance to Tequesquitengo.

Because of the state's mild climate and Cuernavaca's cultural tradition, many Mexican and foreign artists and writers have made the state home. Joy Laville is from Wight, England and resides in Cuernavaca. She is known for her landscapes which often include nude humans. Some of her works are Mujer viendo una casa, Mujer en perfil and Mujer con flores. Jorge Cázares Campos is a native of the state who is a self-taught painter, mostly of Mexican landscapes. Rafael Cauduro was born in Mexico City and his artwork has brought him fame not only in Morelos but internationally as well. Magali Lara is also originally from Mexico City and has had shows in various countries. Morelos native Carlos Campos Campus is known for his sculpture with pre-Hispanic influence. John Spencer was an American artist and writer whose legacy includes the Casona Spencer across from the cathedral and the murals of the Church of the Three Kings in the Santa Maria neighborhood in the north part of the city.

As for the literary heritage of Morelos, the most important writer was Ignacio Manuel Altamirano, author of El Zarco, the story of the leader of a group of bandits based in Yautepec during the Reform War, 1857–1860. Another well-known writer is Malcolm Lowry, an Englishman who wrote Under the Volcano in the first half of the 20th century. It is set in Cuernavaca and made the city internationally famous. Elena Garro is an important Mexican writer originally from Puebla, but who lived most of her life in Cuernavaca. She is known for works such as Los recuerdos del porvenir, El árbol and Andarse por las ramas. Another Mexican transplant to Cuernavaca is Franciso Hinojosa, one of the best-known authors of children's literature in the country.

Poets Raúl Isidro Burgos (b. in Cuernavaca 1890, d. in Mexico City 1971), Raúl Isidro Burgos (b. in Jojutla 1975), Miguel Ángel Muñoz Palos (b. in Cuernavaca 1972), and Luis Ruiz de Velasco (b. in Jojutla 1909, d. in Mexico City 2003).

Other writers are Agustín Aragón y León (b. in Jonacatepec 1870, d. in Mexico City 1954), Erwin Möller (b. in Cuernavaca 1954), and Gerardo Horacio Porcayo (b. in Cuernavaca 1964).

=== Architecture ===
==== Pre-Hispanic ====
The most important pre-Hispanic ruins are found at the Xochicalco. This is a fortified city that was built on top of a large hill, including a Temple of Quetzalcoatl as its center. There is an observatory, three ball courts, and a tezmacal (steam bath) as well as a large museum. Xochicalco displays significant influence from Teotihuacan, the Maya civilization, and Monte Albán.

Teopanzolco is located in Cuernavaca. The twin temple and several smaller structures were built by Tlahuicas. Recent excavations suggest it dates from 1200 CE and it may have served as a model for the Templo Mayor in Mexico City.

Other important archaeological sites in Morelos are: Olintepec, Ayala. 14 structures that date from 1500–1200 BCE; Las Pilas, Jonacatepec. 4 pyramids and 2 plazas from 700–500 BCE located inside a water park; Tepozteco, Tepoztlan. A small pyramid built at the top of a hill in about 1200 BCE and last modified in 1452; Yautepec. From the periodo postclásico medio y tardío, this was a center for 11,500 people; Chalcatzingo, Jantetelco. Constructions and petroglyphs from 1500–200 BCE. There are clear influences of the Olmecs from Veracruz and Tabasco, and Coatetelco, Miacatlán. Pyramids, platforms, and a ball court that date from 200–1521 CE.

==== Colonial era and early independence ====
After the Spanish conquest of the Aztec Empire, major constructions here were Christian instead of the native pagan. In the first half of the 16th century, a series of fortress-like church and monastery complexes were built around the slopes of the Popocatepetl volcano from Cuernavaca to Tetela del Volcán, and on into Puebla state, all related to early evangelization efforts. Today, these monasteries are no longer used as such, although most of the churches associated with them remain active, and are now a World Heritage Site.

Non-ecclesiastical buildings from the colonial and independence periods were mostly confined to the capital of Cuernavaca and include the Palace of Cortes, the Jardin Borda (Borda Garden), the Cine Morelos and the Ocampo Theater. The kiosk of the Jardin Juarez in Cuernavaca was designed by Gustave Eiffel in 1886.

Much of the rest of the state was divided into large haciendas, many dedicated to sugar production, with large mansions for their owners. Some of the most interesting are

- Museo del Agrarismo Ex-Hacienda de Chinameca, Ciudad Ayala, Ayala, (museum: site where Emiliano Zapata was assassinated 19 April 1919)
- Hacienda de Chiconcuac, Xochitopec (rental for special events)
- Hacienda San Carlos, Yautepec (rental for special events; Zapatista Gen. Beningo Zeteno was hanged there during the Revolution)
- Hacienda de San Gaspar, Jiutepec (rental for special events; golf course, Catholic chapel open to public for Sunday mass)
- Hacienda de San Jacinto Ixtoluca, Tlaquiltenango (water park; Zapatista Gen. Otilio Montaňo was killed there under mysterious circumstances.)
- Hacienda de San Jose Acamilpa, Tlaquiltenango (luxury hotel & restaurant)
- Hacienda San Gabriel de las Palmas, Amacuzac (luxury hotel & restaurant)
- Hacienda San Antonio Caohuixtla, Ayala (rustic, camping, horseback riding, banquets)
- Hacienda de Santa Ana Tenango, Jantetelco (social events)
- Hacienda de Temixco (water park; concentration camp for Japanese-Mexicans during WWII)
- Hacienda Santa Cruz Vista Alegre Casco Antiguo y Trapiche, Mazatepec (small hotel, camping)
- Hacienda Antonio Atlacomulco (Ex-Hacienda de Cortés), Atlacomulco, Jiutepec (luxury hotel & restaurant)
- Hacienda Cocoyoc, Yautepec (large hotel, restaurant, golf course)
- Hotel Hacienda San Jóse Vista Hermosa, Puente de Ixtla; (family hotel & restaurant)

==== 20th and 21st centuries ====
One notable 20th-century structure was the Japanese-style house built by Woolworths heiress Barbara Hutton, in Jiutepec, just outside the city of Cuernavaca. This is a hotel and restaurant today.

A modern Catholic church is the Capilla Abierta de San José in Lomas de Cuernavaca, Temixco. The church was designed by Spanish architect Félix Candela in the 1950s in the style known as Techos de Cascaron. Set upon a hill, the open-air chapel offers an impressive view of the Valley of Cuernavaca.

The Centro Cultural Pedro López Elías (Pedro Lopez Elias Cultural Center) in Tepoztlan opened in 2016. It is the first ecological library in Mexico, contains 50,000 books, and has 42,000 solar panels. The Centro Cultural Teopanzolco (Teopanzolco Cultural Center) next to the pyramids in Cuernavaca was designed by the Mexican architects Isaac Broid. The triangles that dictate the composition mark this point of meeting between past and present. It opened in 2018.

== Education ==
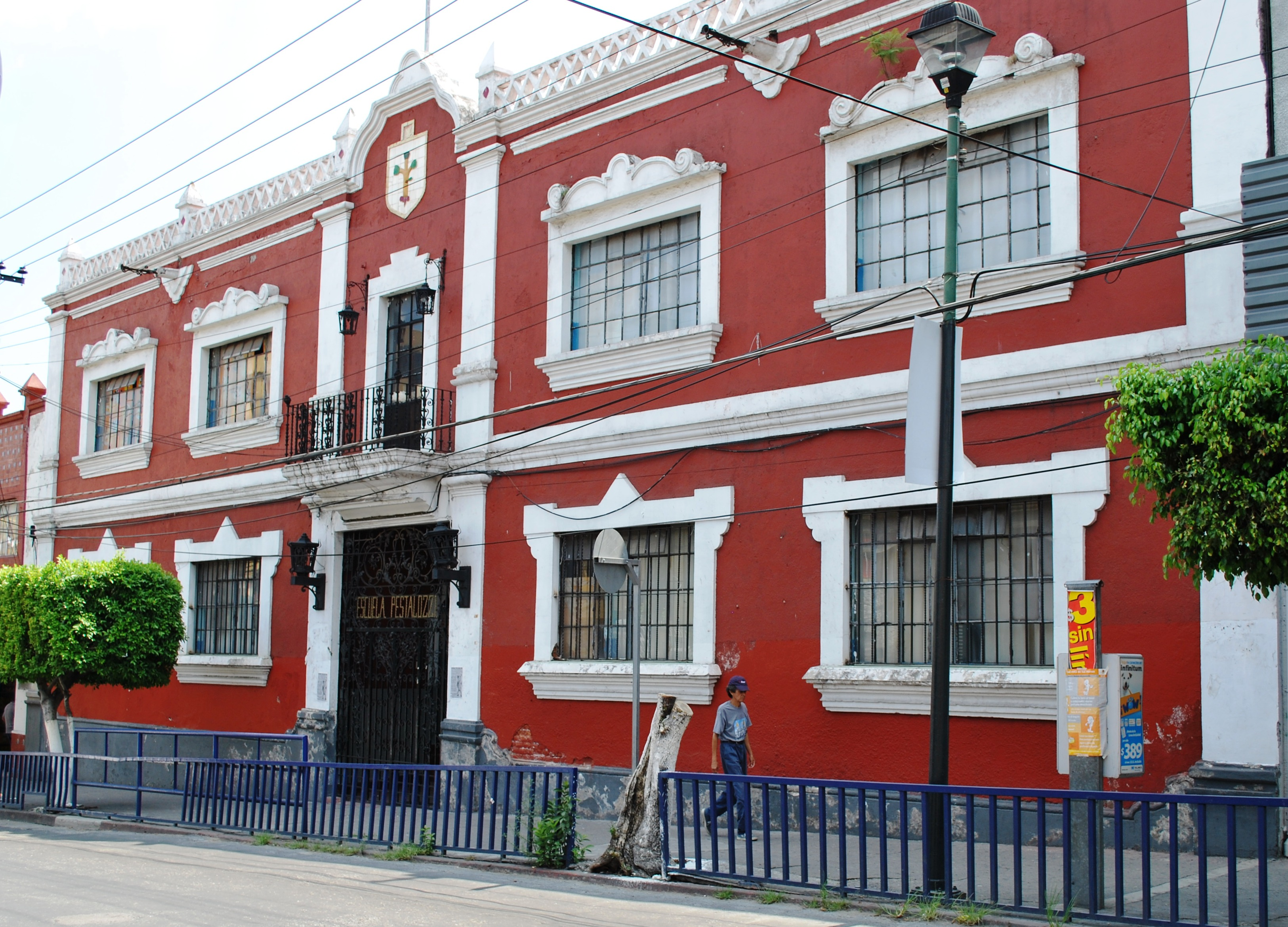
Pestalozzi School in Cuernavaca

The state, especially in the Cuernavaca area, is known as a center of education, second to Mexico City. The state has a high percentage of educated and well-traveled people, many of whom speak second languages such as English, French and German.

Modern education in the state began during the Reform period, with the Mexican government taking over educational responsibilities from the church. The government's role in education expanded after the Mexican Revolution. In Morelos, the government founded "Casas del Pueblo" (People's Houses) staffed with a teacher for the community to become a central figure. In 1936, the Escuela Regional Campesina (Farm Workers' Regional School) was established in Yautepec and a short time after that President Lázaro Cárdenas founded the Escuela Normal Feminina de Palmira (Palmira Teachers College for Women) and the Instituto Federal de Capacitacion del Magisterio for those to earn or complete their teaching credentials.

Until 1991, education was rigidly centralized and bureaucratic, causing difficulties in providing adequate education to many areas. In 1992, the Instituto de la Educación Básica (IEBM) (Basic Education Institute) was created to change this. This divided basic education into preschool, special education, primary and secondary.

Today over 360,000 students are taught by over 13,000 teachers in 823 schools up to the ninth grade. All municipalities are required by state law to provide preschool, and grade school education to their populations up to the ninth grade, as well as professional development for teachers. All are required to attend school up to the ninth grade. Most schoolchildren begin with at least one year of preschool or kindergarten and secondary school (middle school) is provided either through face-to-face classes or through "telesecundarias" with televised classes in the more rural areas. Secondary schools are also divided into general and technical schools. The state has four teachers' colleges, two which produce primary school teachers and two which produce secondary school teachers. The state education system provides education from preschool to high school, vocational-technical education, as well as higher education to the doctoral level. There are also "centros de capacitacion" or training centers for workers looking to improve basic skills or gain technical skills. The average number of years of schooling completed is 8.4 years (second year of middle school), with the national average at 8.1.

There are a total of 32 institutions of higher education in the state. The state has been encouraging schools and universities to set up campuses in Morelos to escape the hustle and bustle of Mexico City. This includes: Universidad de la Salle, Universidad Latinoamericano (ULO), Tecnologico de Monterrey (ITESM), and Universidad Latina (UNILA).

The origins of the Universidad Autónoma del Estado de Morelos (UAEM) date back to the 19th century, when governor Francisco Leyva founded the Instituto Literario y Cientifico de Morelos in 1871. It was mostly suspended shortly thereafter by President Porfirio Díaz, a political opponent of Leyva, leaving only the School of Agriculture and Veterinary Studies in Acapantzingo. It was revived under the name of Instituto de Estudios Superiores del Estado de Morelos by Governor Elpidio Perdomo and President Lázaro Cárdenas. It was reorganized under its current name in 1953, after the addition of more fields of study. Currently, the school offers forty bachelor's degrees.

== Transportation and communications ==
Telecommunications in the state include telegraph, mail service, telephone, rural telephone service, terrestrial and satellite television, telex, and internet.

Rural telephone service is available via satellite in the municipalities of Amacuzac, Ayala, Puente de Ixtla, Jojutla, Tlaltizapan and Tlaquiltenango. There are 342,240 landline telephones in total.

There are 26 radio stations in Morelos (four AM and 22 FM). Morelos operates a public television station, XHCMO-TV Channel 3 in Cuernavaca, with a repeater, XHMZE-TV channel 22, in Zacatepec. Cuernavaca also has five other terrestrial television stations available, some local and others repeaters of Mexico City-based stations.

Newspapers of Morelos include: Diario de Morelos, El Regional del Sur, El Sol de Cuautla, El Sol de Cuernavaca, La Jornada de Morelos, La Unión de Morelos, and Unomásuno Morelos.

Morelos is the most-connected state in terms of roadways, with highways connecting all of its communities. It has 416 km (258 mi) of federal highways (including 159.5 km (99.1 mi) of tollways), 1,127 km (700 mi) of state highways (two or more lanes, paved), 394 km (245 mi) of rural highways (paved), and 394 km (245 mi) of improved paths, for a total of 2,369 km (1,472 mi) of highways. There are 259 km (161 mi) of rail lines.

The Cuernavaca Airport is General Mariano Matamoros International Airport, south of Cuernavaca in Acatlipa, Temixco. It has a 2.7 kilometres (1.7 mi) runway. It opened in 1988, and since 2009 it has been operated by the firm Aeropuerto de Cuernavaca S. A. de C. V.

== See also ==
- Morelos Commune
- Mendicant monasteries in Mexico
- List of people from Morelos

== Bibliography ==
- Jimenez Gonzalez, Victor Manuel, ed. (2009). Morelos: Guia para descubrir los encantos del estado [Morelos: Guide to discover the charms of the state] (in Spanish). Mexico City: Editorial Oceano de Mexico SA de CV. ISBN 978-607-400-230-0.
- Romo, Luis (2006). "La ciudad de la eterna primavera" [The city of eternal spring]. Rutas Turisticas:Morelos Mexico Desconocido (in Spanish). 130. Mexico City: Grupo Editorial Impresiones Aéreas. ISSN 0188-5146.
- Secretaria de Educación Publica. Morelos: Monografía estatal: 1982.
