= Coat of arms of Morelos =

Coat of Arms of Morelos

The Coat of arms of Morelos (Spanish: Escudo de Morelos, lit. "state shield of Morelos") is a symbol of the Free and Sovereign State of Morelos.

== Symbolism ==
The coat of arms of the state of Morelos represents the "fertility of the land." It also represents revolutionary ideals and aspirations. A green terrace can be seen from which a golden corn plant grows; between it and the star that crowns it, the motto "Land and Freedom" can be read in a silver band of the same color.

Above it appears a star and a silver ribbon with the legend "Land and Liberty" and around it you can read the revolutionary motto: "The land will return to those who work it with their hands," a phrase by the native hero Emiliano Zapata.

Framed around the emblem is a band with the legend "The land belongs to those who work it with their hands"; this frame is complemented by a green border on the inside and a red border on the outside of the shield. It synthesizes the strength of the revolutionary ideals in the service of better living conditions for the people.

== History ==
The coat of arms of the state of Morelos was designed by the painter Diego Rivera in 1923.

=== Historical coats ===
The symbol is used by all successive regimes in different forms.

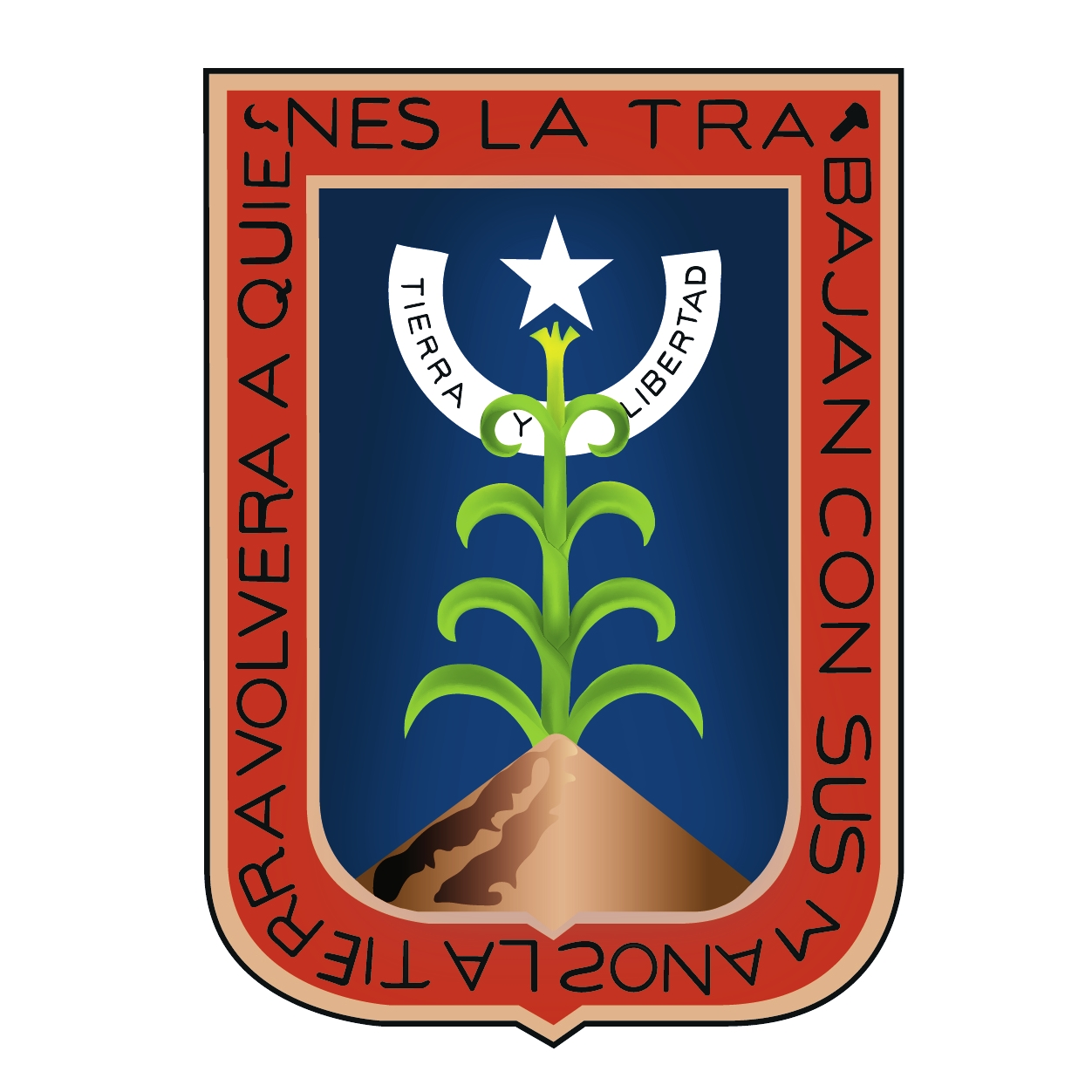
Coat of arms from 1923 to 1992.

== See also ==
- Morelos
- Coat of arms of Mexico
