= XHMZE-TDT =

XHMZE-TV
- Zacatepec, Morelos; Mexico
- Channels: Digital: 21 (UHF); Virtual: 22
- Branding: Canal 22 Morelos

Programming
- Affiliations: Independent cultural

Ownership
- Owner: Presidencia Municipal de Zacatepec, Mor.

History
- Founded: February 15, 1999
- Call sign meaning: Morelos Zacatepec

Technical information
- ERP: 45.6 watts (analog); 100 watts (new transmitter operating power)
- Transmitter coordinates: 18°39′14″N 99°11′37″W

Links
- Website: canal22morelos.com.mx

XHMZE-TV is a television station in Zacatepec, Morelos. Broadcasting on virtual channel 22 (physical channel 21) from a transmitter located in the city proper, Canal 22 is owned by the municipality of Zacatepec.

== History ==
On February 15, 1999, the Secretariat of Communications and Transportation awarded a permit for a non-commercial television station on channel 22 to the municipality. It was the first time a municipality had received a permit for a television station in Mexico and Latin America, and it also represented the second local public television station in the state of Morelos, after XHCMO-TV in Cuernavaca. The station had previously operated unlicensed on channel 17.

In 2011, the town council of Zacatepec authorized an outsourcing agreement under which the operations of channel 22 would be undertaken by a private venture, the Society for the Economic Development and Promotion of Investment in Municipalities (abbreviated as DEFIMEX). However, a change in municipal administration occurred in January 2013, and the new government immediately set out to cancel the agreement and retake control of the station, responding to concerns that a public resource should not be operated privately. In March 2013, the municipality bought a new transmitter for the station, as the old one had burned. However, legal action by DEFIMEX to the tune of millions of US dollars, as well as the discoveries that the station had been illegally tapping into CFE power facilities and that the structure had several deficiencies, had kept the station off the air.

XHMZE made a brief return on February 2, 2015 with a local news program, but the transmitter failed again. The station also confronts issues related to the recognition of the current municipal administration, as well as with the digital television transition and the associated applications and technical changes.

In mid-2015, XHMZE began broadcasting in digital on physical channel 21, with a formal launch on December 15. and it began branding as "Canal 22 Morelos" with a logo very similar to that of the national Canal 22, which is unrelated. XHMZE also carries XHCMO programming, which marks the first time that the state-owned cultural channel has been available in southern Morelos.

XHMZE is available on cable and satellite across the state of Morelos.
