= 5th federal electoral district of Morelos =

Federal electoral district of Mexico

Morelos's 5th
- Electoral district of the Chamber of Deputies of Mexico

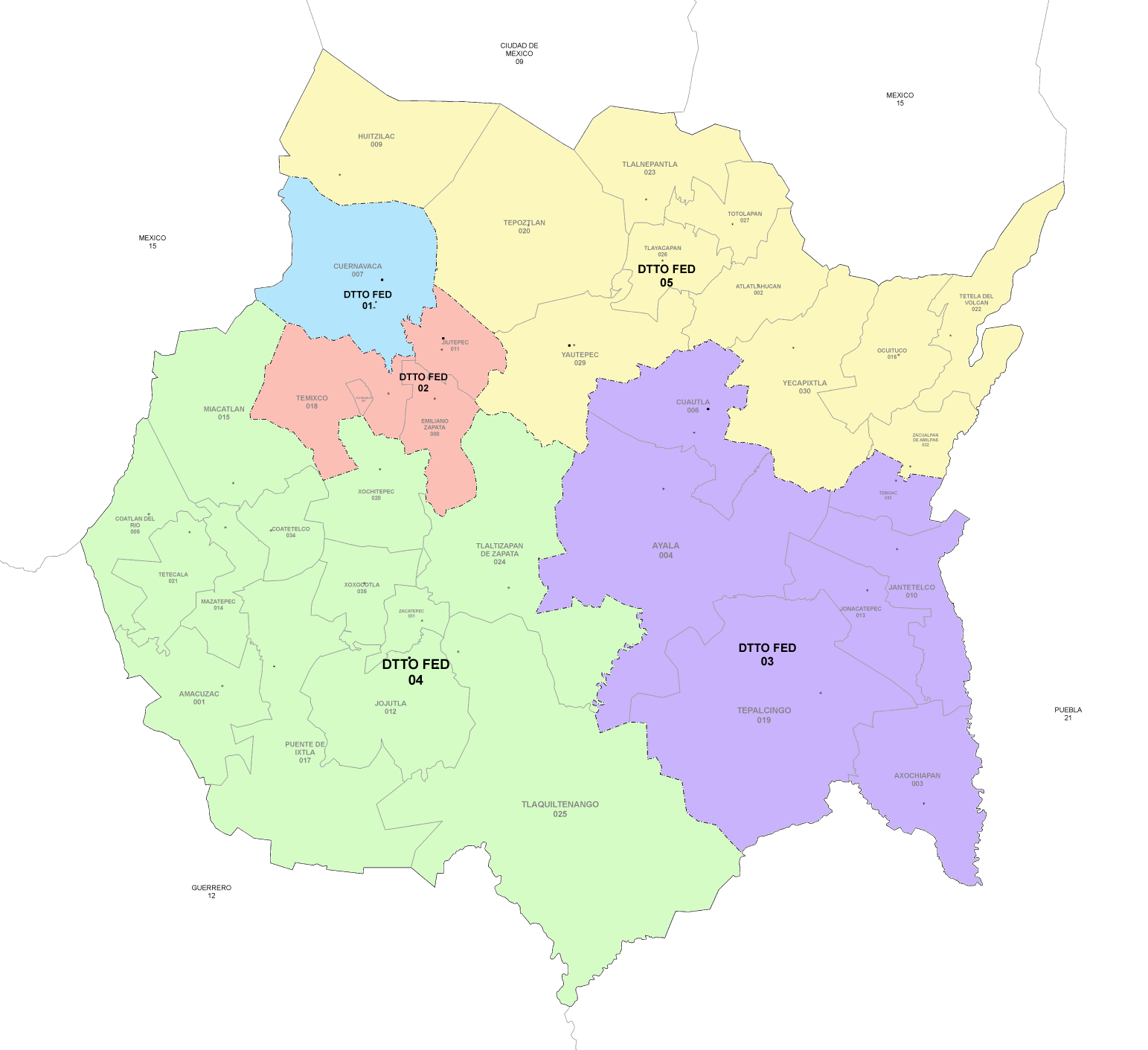
- 5th district

Incumbent
- Member: Agustín Alonso Gutiérrez
- Party: ▌Morena
- Congress: 66th (2024–2027)

District
- State: Morelos
- Head town: Yautepec
- Coordinates: 18°53′N 99°03′W
- Covers: 11 municipalities: Atlatlahucan, Huitzilac, Ocuituco, Tepoztlán, Tetela del Volcán, Tlalnepantla, Tlayacapan, Totolapan, Yautepec, Yecapixtla, Zacualpan de Amilpas
- PR region: Fourth
- Precincts: 157
- Population: 357,819 (2020 census)

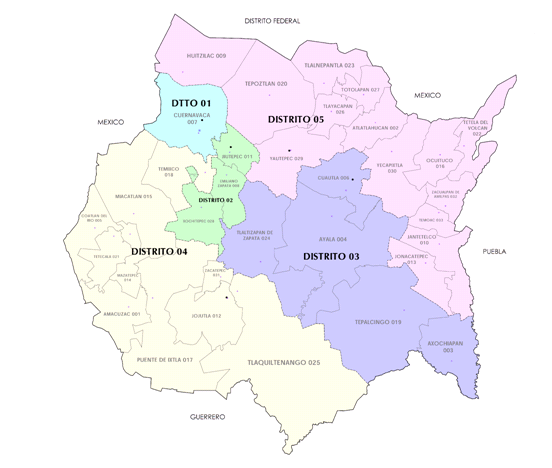
Morelos under the 2017–2022 districting plan

The 5th federal electoral district of Morelos (Spanish: Distrito electoral federal 05 de Morelos) is one of the 300 electoral districts into which Mexico is divided for elections to the federal Chamber of Deputies and one of five such districts in the state of Morelos.

It elects one deputy to the lower house of Congress for each three-year legislative period by means of the first-past-the-post system. Votes cast in the district also count towards the calculation of proportional representation ("plurinominal") deputies elected from the fourth region.

The fifth district was created by the 2005 redistricting process and, accordingly, it elected its first deputy in the 2006 general election.

The current member for the district, elected in the 2024 general election, is Agustín Alonso Gutiérrez of the National Regeneration Movement (Morena).

== District territory ==
Under the 2023 districting plan adopted by the National Electoral Institute (INE), which is to be used for the 2024, 2027 and 2030 federal elections, the 5th district covers 157 precincts (secciones electorales) across 11 municipalities in the north of the state:

- Atlatlahucan, Huitzilac, Ocuituco, Tepoztlán, Tetela del Volcán, Tlalnepantla, Tlayacapan, Totolapan, Yautepec, Yecapixtla and Zacualpan de Amilpas.

The head town (cabecera distrital), where results from individual polling stations are gathered together and tallied, is the city of Yautepec de Zaragoza. The district reported a population of 357,819 in the 2020 census.

== Previous districting schemes ==
Evolution of electoral district numbers
| | 1974 | 1978 | 1996 | 2005 | 2017 | 2023 |
|---|---|---|---|---|---|---|
| Morelos | 2 | 4 | 4 | 5 | 5 | 5 |
| Chamber of Deputies | 196 | 300 | | | | |

2017–2022

Under the scheme in force from 2017 to 2022, the 5th district comprised 14 municipalities, with its head town at Yautepec:
- Atlatlahucan, Huitzilac, Jantetelco, Jonacatepec, Ocuituco, Temoac, Tepoztlán, Tetela del Volcán, Tlalnepantla, Tlayacapan, Totolapan, Yautepec, Yecapixtla and Zacualpan.

2005–2017

Morelos gained its fifth congressional seat in the 2005 plan. The new district's head town was at Yautepec and it covered nine municipalities:
- Axochiapan, Ayala, Jantetelco, Jonacatepec, Temoac, Tepalcingo, Tlaltizapan, Yautepec and Zacualpan.

== Deputies returned to Congress ==
(Mexico) National parties
- Current
- PAN
- PRI
- PT
- PVEM
- MC
- Morena
- PAZ
- Somos
- Defunct or local only
- PLM
- PNR
- PRM
- PNM
- PP
- PPS
- PARM
- PFCRN
- CON
- PANAL
- PSD
- PES
- PES
- PRD

Morelos's 5th district
| Election | Deputy | Party | Term | Legislature |
|---|---|---|---|---|
| 2006 | José Víctor Sánchez Trujillo | National Action Party (Mexico) | 2006–2009 | 60th Congress |
| 2009 | Jaime Sánchez Vélez | Institutional Revolutionary Party | 2009–2012 | 61st Congress |
| 2012 | Víctor Reymundo Nájera Medina | Party of the Democratic Revolution | 2012–2015 | 62nd Congress |
| 2015 | Ángel García Yáñez | New Alliance Party (Mexico) | 2015–2018 | 63rd Congress |
| 2018 | José Guadalupe Ambrocio Gachuz | National Regeneration Movement | 2018–2021 | 64th Congress |
| 2021 | José Guadalupe Ambrocio Gachuz | National Regeneration Movement | 2021–2024 | 65th Congress |
| 2024 | Agustín Alonso Gutiérrez | National Regeneration Movement | 2024–2027 | 66th Congress |

== Presidential elections ==
Morelos's 5th district
| Election | District won by | Party or coalition | % |
|---|---|---|---|
| 2018 | Andrés Manuel López Obrador | Juntos Haremos Historia | 69.4056 |
| 2024 | Claudia Sheinbaum Pardo | Sigamos Haciendo Historia | 67.6149 |
