= 3rd federal electoral district of Morelos =

Federal electoral district of Mexico

Morelos's 3rd
- Electoral district of the Chamber of Deputies of Mexico

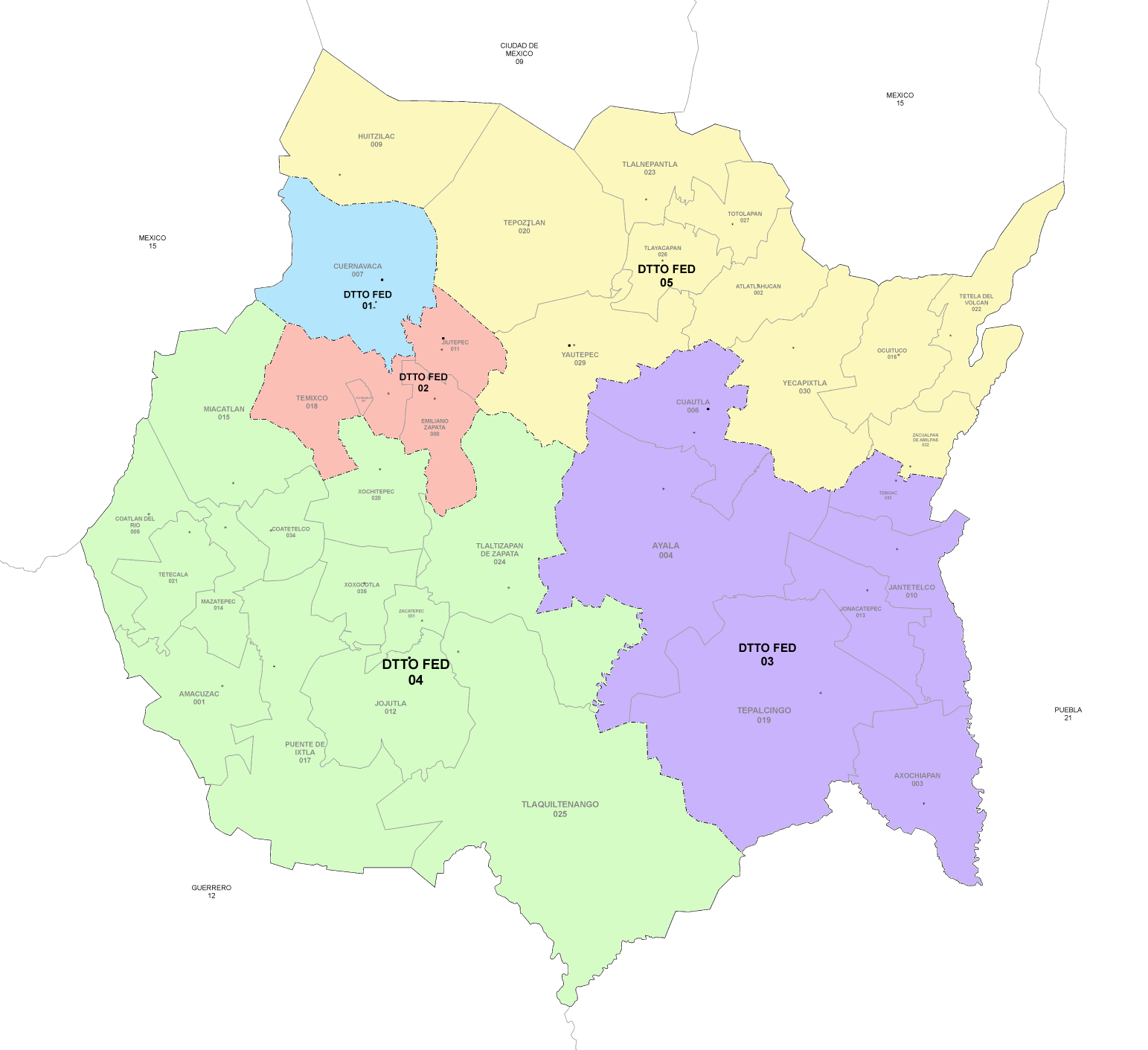
- 3rd district

Incumbent
- Member: Cindy Winkler Trujillo
- Party: ▌Ecologist Green Party
- Congress: 66th (2024–2027)

District
- State: Morelos
- Head town: Cuautla
- Coordinates: 18°48′N 98°57′W
- Covers: Axochiapan, Ayala, Cuautla, Tepalcingo, Jantetelco, Jonacatepec, Temoac
- PR region: Fourth
- Precincts: 195
- Population: 396,172 (2020 census)

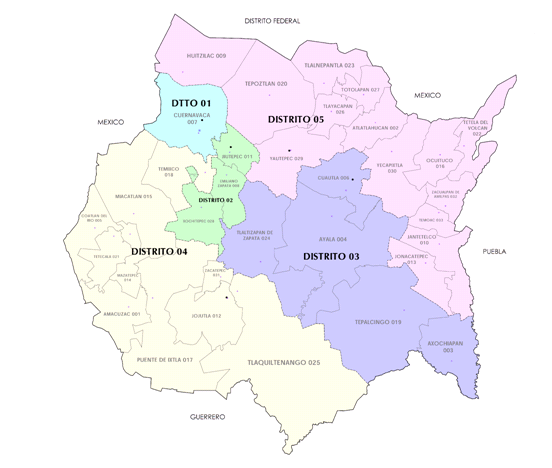
Morelos under the 2017–2022 districting plan

The 3rd federal electoral district of Morelos (Spanish: Distrito electoral federal 03 de Morelos) is one of the 300 electoral districts into which Mexico is divided for elections to the federal Chamber of Deputies and one of five such districts in the state of Morelos.

It elects one deputy to the lower house of Congress for each three-year legislative period by means of the first-past-the-post system. Votes cast in the district also count towards the calculation of proportional representation ("plurinominal") deputies elected from the fourth region.

Suspended in 1930, (Note: An amendment to Article 52 of the Constitution in 1928 changed the original provision of "one deputy per 60,000 inhabitants" to "one deputy per 100,000"; as a result, the size of the Chamber of Deputies fell from 281 in the 1928 election to 171 in 1934.) the 3rd district was re-established by the 1977 electoral reforms, which increased the number of single-member seats in the Chamber of Deputies from 196 to 300. Under those reforms, Morelos's seat allocation rose from two to four. The two new districts were first contested in the 1979 mid-term election.

The current member for the district, elected in the 2024 general election, is Cindy Winkler Trujillo of the Ecologist Green Party of Mexico (PVEM).

== District territory ==
Under the 2023 districting plan adopted by the National Electoral Institute (INE), which is to be used for the 2024, 2027 and 2030 federal elections, the 3rd district comprises 195 precincts (secciones electorales) across seven municipalities in the south-east of the state:

- Axochiapan, Ayala, Cuautla, Tepalcingo, Jantetelco, Jonacatepec and Temoac.

The head town (cabecera distrital), where results from individual polling stations are gathered together and tallied, is the city of Cuautla. The district reported a population of 396,172 in the 2020 census.

== Previous districting schemes ==
Evolution of electoral district numbers
| | 1974 | 1978 | 1996 | 2005 | 2017 | 2023 |
|---|---|---|---|---|---|---|
| Morelos | 2 | 4 | 4 | 5 | 5 | 5 |
| Chamber of Deputies | 196 | 300 | | | | |

2017–2022

Under the scheme in force from 2017 to 2022, the 3rd district had its head town at Cuautla and it comprised five municipalities:
- Axochiapan, Ayala, Cuautla, Tepalcingo and Tlaltizapán.

2005–2017

Under the 2005 plan, which gave Morelos its fifth congressional seat, the district's head town was at Cuautla and it covered 10 municipalities:
- Atlatlahucan, Cuautla, Huitzilac, Ocuituco, Tepoztlán, Tetela del Volcán, Tlalnepantla, Tlayacapan, Totolapan and Yecapixtla.

1996–2005

In the 1996 scheme, the district had its head town at Cuautla and it comprised 11 municipalities:
- Axochiapan, Ayala, Cuautla, Jantetelco, Jonacatepec, Ocuituco, Temoac, Tepalcingo, Tetela del Volcán, Yecapixtla and Zacualpan.

1978–1996

The districting scheme in force from 1978 to 1996 was the result of the 1977 electoral reforms, which increased the number of single-member seats in the Chamber of Deputies from 196 to 300. Under that plan, Morelos's seat allocation rose from two to four. The new 3rd district's head town was at Yautepec and it covered 13 municipalities:
- Atlatlahucan, Emiliano Zapata, Huitzilac, Jiutepec, Ocuituco, Temixco, Tepoztlán, Tetela del Volcán, Tlalnepantla, Tlayacapan, Totolapan, Yautepec and Yecapixtla.

== Deputies returned to Congress ==
(Mexico) National parties
- Current
- PAN
- PRI
- PT
- PVEM
- MC
- Morena
- PAZ
- Somos
- Defunct or local only
- PLM
- PNR
- PRM
- PNM
- PP
- PPS
- PARM
- PFCRN
- CON
- PANAL
- PSD
- PES
- PES
- PRD

Morelos's 3rd district
| Election | Deputy | Party | Term | Legislature |
|---|---|---|---|---|
| 1916 | Álvaro L. Alcázar | | 1916–1917 | Constituent Congress of Querétaro |
| 1917 | None | | 1917–1918 | 27th Congress |
| 1918 | None | | 1918–1920 | 28th Congress |
| 1920 | Francisco de la Torre | | 1920–1922 | 29th Congress |
| 1922 | Vicente Aranda | | 1922–1924 | 30th Congress |
| 1924 | Silvano Sotelo | | 1924–1926 | 31st Congress |
| 1926 | Eugenio Mier y Terán | | 1926–1928 | 32nd Congress |
| 1928 | Pedro Torres | | 1928–1930 | 33rd Congress |
The 3rd district was suspended between 1930 and 1979
| 1979 | Gonzalo Pastrana Castro | Institutional Revolutionary Party | 1979–1982 | 51st Congress |
| 1982 | Lorenzo García Solís | Institutional Revolutionary Party | 1982–1985 | 52nd Congress |
| 1985 | Elvia Lugo Becerril | Institutional Revolutionary Party | 1985–1988 | 53rd Congress |
| 1988 | Carlos Enrique Sánchez Mendoza | Party of the Cardenist Front of National Reconstruction | 1988–1991 | 54th Congress |
| 1991 | Tomás Osorio Avilés | Institutional Revolutionary Party | 1991–1994 | 55th Congress |
| 1994 | Juan Salgado Brito | Institutional Revolutionary Party | 1994–1997 | 56th Congress |
| 1997 | Gerardo Ramírez Vidal | Party of the Democratic Revolution | 1997–2000 | 57th Congress |
| 2000 | Maricela Sánchez Cortés | Institutional Revolutionary Party | 2000–2003 | 58th Congress |
| 2003 | Guillermo Del Valle Reyes | Institutional Revolutionary Party | 2003–2006 | 59th Congress |
| 2006 | Rafael Franco Melgarejo | Party of the Democratic Revolution | 2006–2009 | 60th Congress |
| 2009 | Luis Félix Rodríguez Sosa | Institutional Revolutionary Party | 2009–2012 | 61st Congress |
| 2012 | Francisco Rodríguez Montero | Party of the Democratic Revolution | 2012–2015 | 62nd Congress |
| 2015 | Lucía Meza Guzmán | Party of the Democratic Revolution | 2015–2018 | 63rd Congress |
| 2018 | Juanita Guerra Mena | National Regeneration Movement | 2018–2021 | 64th Congress |
| 2021 | Juanita Guerra Mena | National Regeneration Movement | 2021–2024 | 65th Congress |
| 2024 | Cindy Winkler Trujillo | Ecologist Green Party of Mexico | 2024–2027 | 66th Congress |

== Presidential elections ==
Morelos's 3rd district
| Election | District won by | Party or coalition | % |
|---|---|---|---|
| 2018 | Andrés Manuel López Obrador | Juntos Haremos Historia | 71.6294 |
| 2024 | Claudia Sheinbaum Pardo | Sigamos Haciendo Historia | 69.3649 |
