= Amatzinac River =

River in Mexico

Coordinates: 18.820909°N 98.752203°W

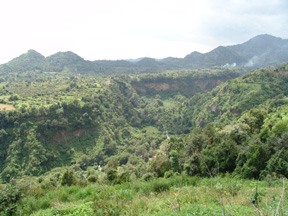
The river valley of Amatzinac near its spring in the foothills of Popocatepetl looking westwards from Hueyapan.

The Amatzinac river also called Tenango is a Mexican river in the states of Morelos and Puebla. It flows south from its spring in the foothills of Popocatépetl and south through the canyon which is also called Amatzinac and reaches the dry plain near Chalcatzingo. It gives waters to the municipalities of Tetela del Volcán, Zacualpan, Temoac and Hueyapan. In dry season the river is little more than a shallow stream but at the end of the rainy season it grows due to the meltwaters from the volcano.

Its name means "little paper river" in the Nahuatl. The river Amatzinac gave its name to a composition for flute and string orchestra by Mexican composer José Pablo Moncayo.
