= Jaime Sánchez =

Jamie Sánchez may refer to:

- Jaime Sánchez (actor) (born 1938), Puerto Rican stage, film and television actor
- Jaime Sánchez (sport shooter) (born 1927), Bolivian sport shooter
- Jaime Sánchez (footballer, born 1973), Spanish football defensive midfielder
- Jaime Sánchez (footballer, born 1995), Spanish football centre-back
- Jaime Sánchez Vélez (born 1962), Mexican politician
