= José Víctor Sánchez Trujillo =

Mexican politician

- Born: 3 November 1965 (age 60); Morelos, Mexico
- Occupation: Politician
- Political party: PAN

José Víctor Sánchez Trujillo (born 3 November 1965) is a Mexican politician affiliated with the National Action Party (PAN). In 2006–2009, he served as a federal deputy in the 60th Congress, representing the newly created fifth district of Morelos.
