= Killing of Samir Flores Soberanes =

Mexican activist (1982–2019)

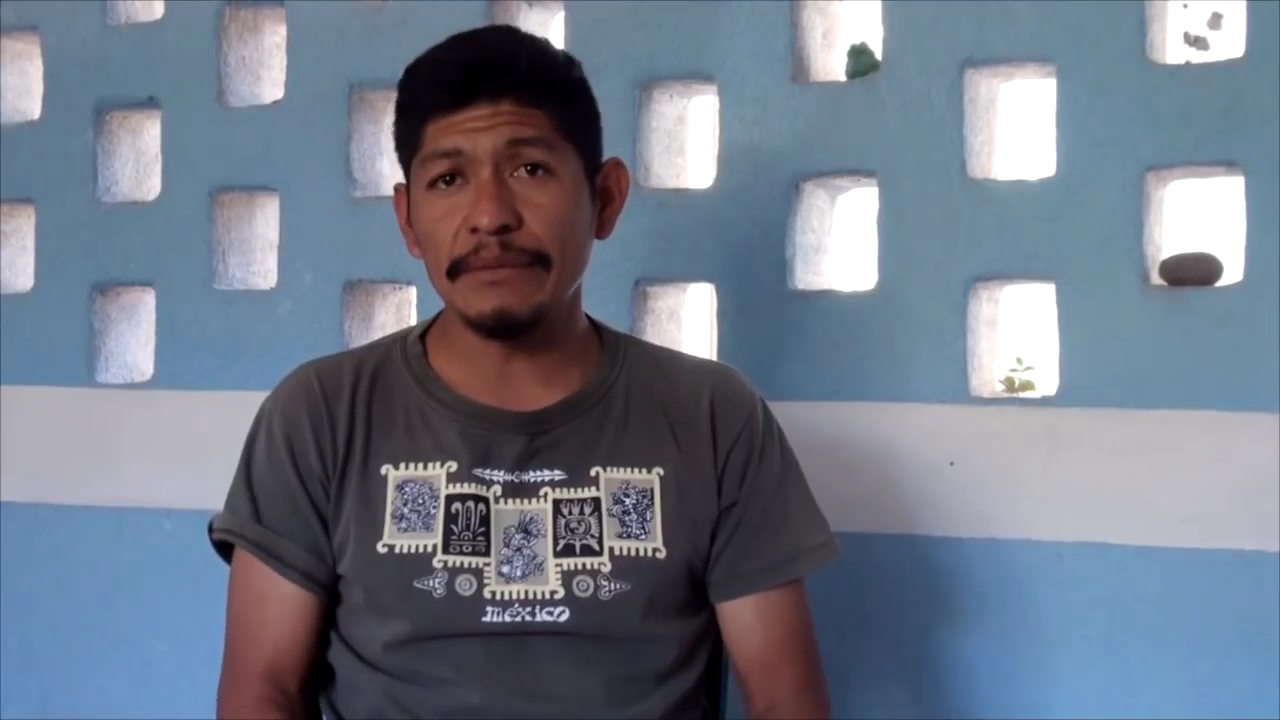
- Flores Soberanes in 2017
- Born: 2 August 1982; Amilcingo, Temoac, Morelos
- Died: 20 February 2019 (aged 36)
- Occupations: Activist, community leader, and community radio host
- Years active: 2016–2019
- Spouse: Liliana Velázquez
- Children: 4

Samir Flores Soberanes (2 August 1982 – 20 February 2019) was a Mexican environmental activist, community leader, and community radio host from Amilcingo, Temoac, Morelos. He became a prominent opponent of the Proyecto Integral Morelos (PIM), a federal infrastructure initiative that included thermoelectric plants and a gas pipeline in central Mexico.

Through community radio and grassroots organizing, Flores Soberanes voiced environmental and social concerns, gaining recognition as a key figure in the regional resistance against the project. Days after publicly confronting government officials over the project, he was murdered outside his home in a case that remains unsolved. His death drew national attention, sparking demands for justice and turning him into a symbol of environmental and Indigenous resistance. Memorials in his honor have since been established across Mexico and abroad.

== Early and personal life ==
Samir Flores Soberanes was born on 2 August 1982 in the locality of Amilcingo, in the municipality of Temoac, Morelos. Raised in a farming family, he pursued studies in computer science and completed one year of law school. Flores Soberanes was actively involved in local politics, regularly participating in community and ejidal assemblies, and he supported initiatives within the state's public education system.

He was married to Liliana Velázquez, with whom he had four children. In his personal time, Flores Soberanes collected rare varieties of corn (Zea mays), especially those with blue, white, purple, or red kernels.

=== Career and activism ===
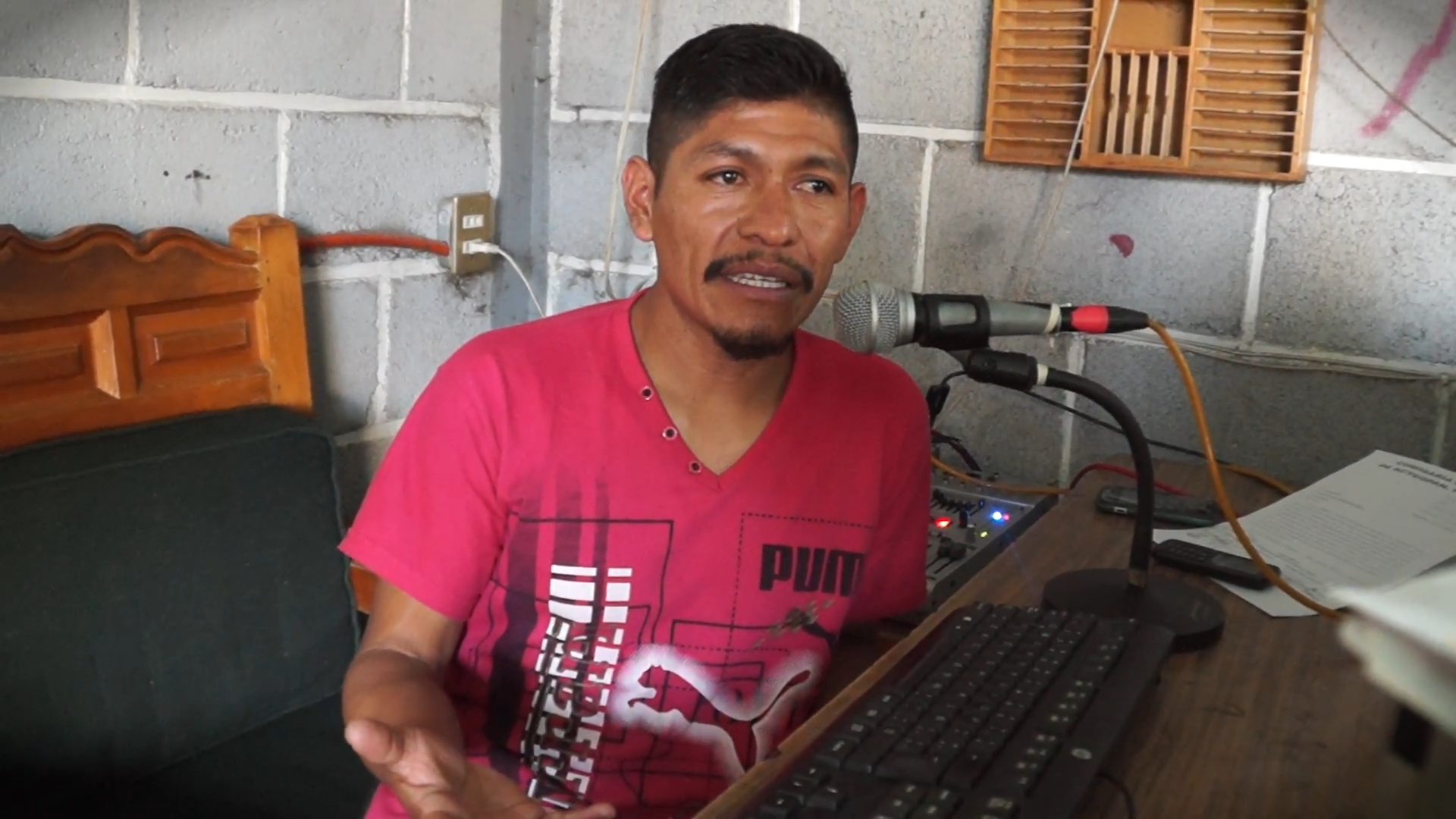
Flores Soberanes hosting Radio Comunitaria Amiltzinko

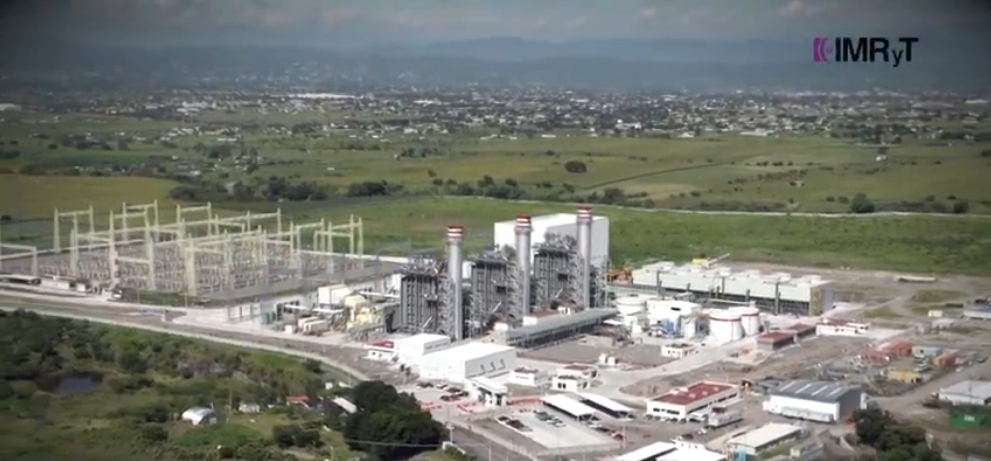
The thermoelectric power plant in Huexca, Morelos

The Mexican federal government launched the Proyecto Integral Morelos (lit. transl. Morelos Integral Project; PIM), a long-term infrastructure initiative formalized in 2012. The project aimed to expand electricity generation in the country's central region and included the construction of two thermoelectric power plants in the community of Huexca, located in Yecapixtla, Morelos. It also involved the development of a gas pipeline traversing the states of Tlaxcala, Puebla, and Morelos, an electrical transmission line connecting to the Yautepec substation, and an aqueduct in Cuautla.

Flores Soberanes became an outspoken critic of the project, citing the environmental harm it posed to his community. On 6 January 2013, he founded the community radio station Amiltzinko, which broadcast on 100.7 MHz FM. He hosted two programs: Las Noticias, where he discussed the government's plans and aired the voices of local opposition, and Amanecer Ranchero, which featured regional Mexican music. Flores Soberanes actively defended the communal lands and natural resources of Amilcingo, opposing efforts to privatize areas containing ahuehuete trees. He was also a member of the Permanent Assembly of the People of Morelos (Asamblea Permanente de los Pueblos de Morelos), a grassroots organization critical of the project, and the National Indigenous Congress.

== Killing and investigation ==
Days before his death, Flores Soberanes had taken part in protests against President Andrés Manuel López Obrador, who had scheduled a public consultation for 23 and 24 February 2019 to decide the future of the project. López Obrador had previously promised in 2014 that, if elected president, he would cancel the project, stating: "How can you build a thermoelectric plant in [Emiliano] Zapata's homeland, the greatest social leader Mexico has ever had? It's like putting a nuclear plant in Jerusalem. We will defend the people, no matter what." Following the protests, López Obrador referred to the opposition as "conservative left-wing radicals". On this, Flores Soberanes remarked: "I can't stop thinking [about] when [Francisco I.] Madero came to power and turned his back on General Zapata. This reminds me of that page in history."

On 19 February, Flores Soberanes attended an informational assembly in the town of Jonacatepec concerning the infrastructure projects he opposed. The event was led by Hugo Eric Flores Cervantes, the federal government's delegate in the state of Morelos. During the assembly, Flores Soberanes challenged the accuracy of the information being presented, describing the consultation as a simulation and accusing the government of promoting a disinformation campaign. Witnesses saw him arguing with Flores Cervantes and other officials at the event. The following morning around 5:30 a.m., Flores Soberanes was shot and killed outside his home by three unidentified individuals.

The state attorney refused to investigate Flores Soberanes's opposition to the PIM as a potential motive behind his killing. Authorities identified three potential suspects. In October 2021, one of them was arrested in Cuautla for alleged involvement in the crime. The Morelos Attorney General's Office, headed by Uriel Carmona, reported that there were efforts to execute arrest warrants for the remaining suspects. According to Governor Cuauhtémoc Blanco, Carmona knew who killed Flores Soberanes, but "he doesn't want to say it out of fear" because "there are many people involved".

One line of investigation from independent groups identifies four suspects in the crime, allegedly linked to the criminal group Los Aparicio, part of the Jalisco New Generation Cartel. The group is reportedly led by the mother-in-law of Valentín Lavín, the municipal president of Temoac. Velázquez and her daughters were placed under the Protection Mechanism for Human Rights Defenders and Journalists. However, in October 2024, she stated that the federal government was seeking to withdraw their protection on the grounds that they were no longer considered to be in danger.

In February 2025, the murder remained under investigation. The person arrested in 2021 was acquitted in March 2026. One suspect was reported to have been killed, while another disappeared.

=== Reactions and legacy ===
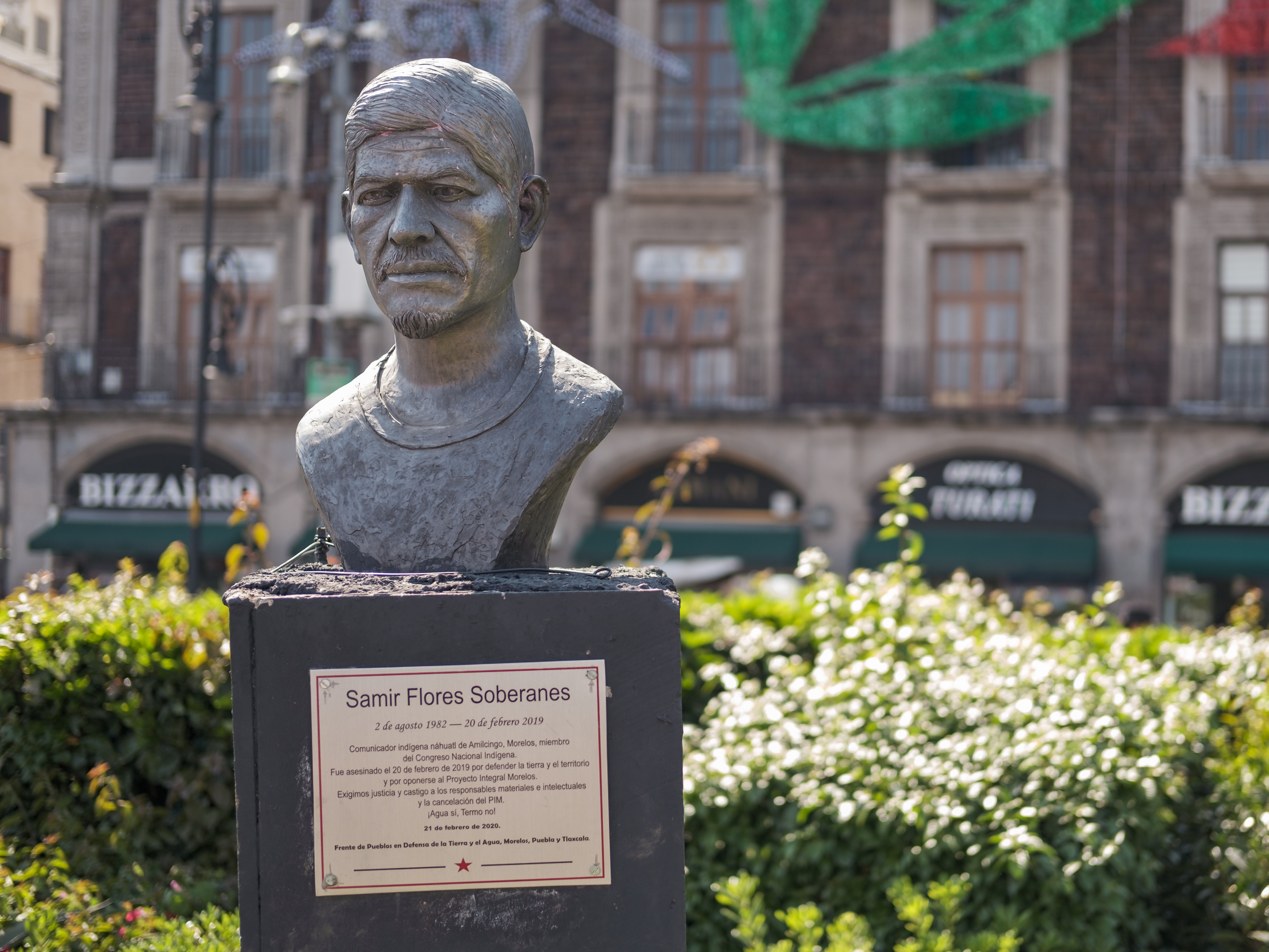
A bust dedicated to Flores Soberanes in Mexico City's Zócalo

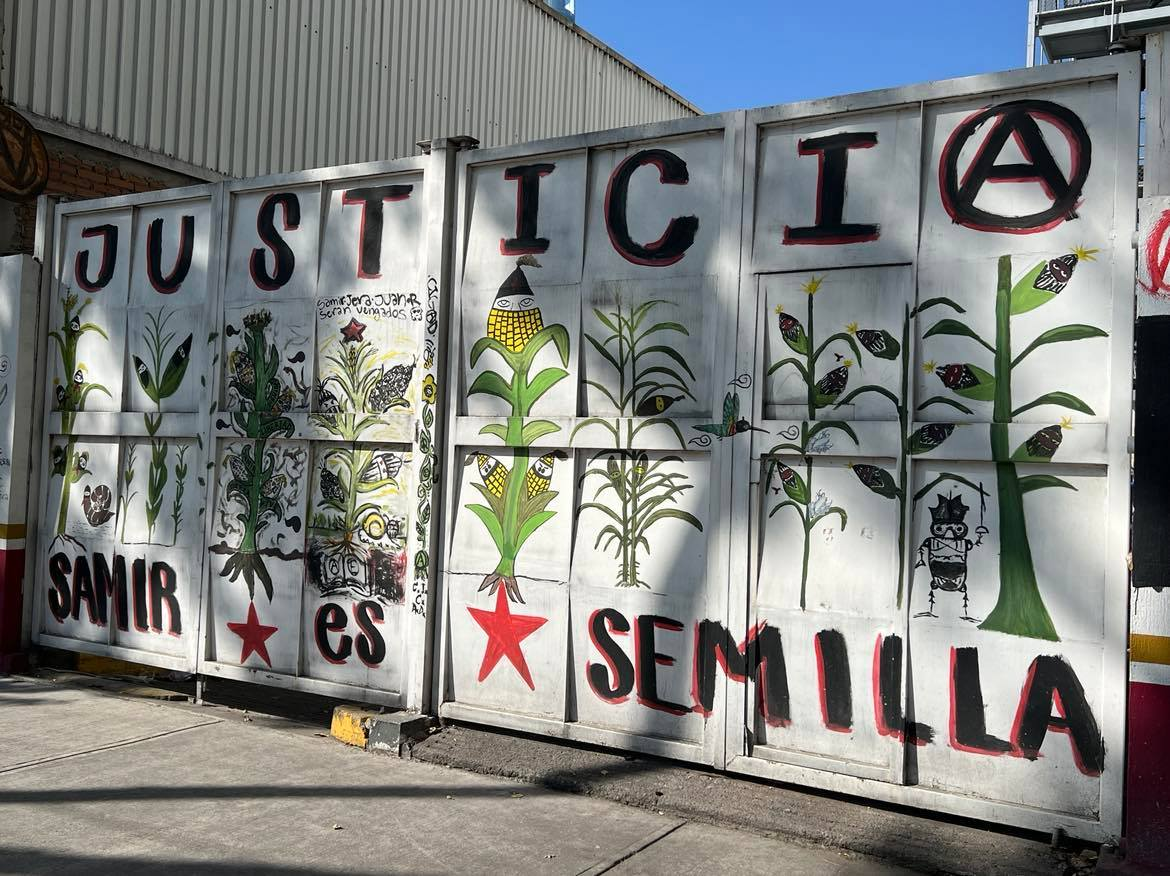
A mural next to the building of the National Institute of Indigenous Peoples bears the phrase "Justice. Samir is Seed" in Spanish, honoring his memory.

The Frente de Pueblos en Defensa del Agua y la Tierra organization (People's Front in Defense of Water and Land) called on the Attorney General of Mexico to investigate Lavín, Blanco, Carmona, Flores Cervantes, and former governor Graco Ramírez for their alleged involvement. They also requested an investigation into President López Obrador for his repeated attacks in speeches against those opposing the PIM. In a joint statement, the National Indigenous Congress, the Indigenous Governing Council, and the Zapatista Army of National Liberation blamed the "bad government and its masters, which are the corporations and their legal and illegal armed groups, who seek to rob us, bring us death, and extinguish the lights that give us hope".

López Obrador called the murder "vile and cowardly" and stated that the consultation would proceed as planned because "perhaps one of the intentions was to disrupt its execution". Flores Cervantes denied any involvement in the murder.

In August 2019, a school in Amilcingo where Flores Soberanes had taught organic agriculture and communication sciences was renamed in his memory. He had also been opposed to its demolition after the 2017 Puebla earthquake. A bust was unveiled at the site on the first anniversary of his death. The next day, demonstrators installed a replica in Mexico City's Zócalo, mounted on a concrete plinth. Another was placed at Ciudad Universitaria, Mexico City, in February 2025. Activists also announced plans to install further replicas in Guadalajara, Puebla, and abroad in Paris and Rome.

== Bibliography ==
- Muñoz Ramírez, Gloria (2020). Samir sin reversa (PDF). Desinformémonos/Rosa Luxemburg Foundation.
