= Rafael Franco Melgarejo =

Mexican politician

- Born: 6 February 1964 (age 62); Morelos, Mexico
- Occupation: Politician
- Political party: PRD

Rafael Franco Melgarejo (born 6 February 1964) is a Mexican politician affiliated with the Party of the Democratic Revolution (PRD). In 2006–2009 he served as a federal deputy in the 60th Congress, representing the third district of Morelos.
