= Hueyapan, Morelos =

Town in Morelos, Mexico

Coordinates: 18°53′08″N 98°41′25″W

Hueyapan
- Municipality
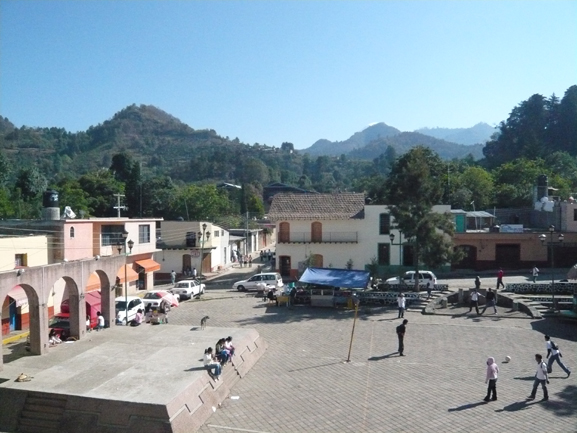

- Location in Mexico Hueyapan (Mexico)
- Country: Mexico
- State: Morelos
- Demonym: (in Spanish)
- Time zone: UTC−6 (CST)

San Andrés Hueyapan is a small town in the rural northeastern part of the Mexican state of Morelos, formerly in the municipality of Tetela del Volcán. It lies at an elevation of ca 2000–2500 metres above sea level on the southern slopes of the active volcano Popocatépetl. To the west of Hueyapan runs the Amatzinac river, to the north is the Popocatépetl-Iztaccíhuatl natural reserve, and to the south the town of Tlacotepec and to the east is the municipality of Tochimilco which belongs to the state of Puebla located in the midlands.

Hueyapan became an independent municipality on January 1, 2019. Other new municipalities are Xoxocotla and Coatetelco. Hueyapan was granted its "clave geoestadística" by INEGI on July 15, 2020, making it eligible for federal funds.

== Ethnography ==
82.7% of the 6,478 residents are indigenous and 43.13% speak an indigenous language; 0.08% do not speak Spanish. The inhabitants of Hueyapan are of Nahua ethnicity and the Nahuatl language is spoken by most adults. The name of the town comes from the Nahuatl language and means on the great water referring to the abundant water resources of the locality. The people of Hueyapan mostly practice subsistence agriculture: They produce maize, beans, squash, peach, avocado and plums. The people of Hueyapan are also known for their woolen products such as ponchos (gabán in the local Spanish), shawls (rebozo) and skirts (chincuete) of thick woolen cloth. The thread is made on traditional spindles called malacates, dyed with natural dyes (such as Añil, Walnut husks, St John's wort) and the fabric is woven on backstrap looms.

Cultural aspects of Hueyapan and particularly the ethnic identity of the Nahuas of Hueyapan have been described in the book Being Indian in Hueyapan by American anthropologist Judith Friedlander. The Nahuatl dialect of Hueyapan has been the object of a few small studies. Karen Dakin and Diana Ryesky have done an ethnolinguistic and dialectal survey of Nahuatl in Morelos, and they describe the dialect of Hueyapan as a typical central dialect with some traits particular of the Morelos varieties. In 1949 Miguel Barrios Espinosa, a teacher from Hueyapan, published a collection of folktales from Hueyapan in the nahuatl language in the journal Tlalocan. An article by Patrick Johansson (1989) deals with the grammatical encoding of honorifics in the Nahuatl language. Currently SIL linguists are working on Morelos Nahuatl, collaborating with speakers from Hueyapan and from Cuentepec.

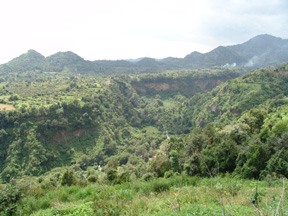
The river valley of Amatzinac looking westwards from Hueyapan

== History ==
According to Durán in 1524, Hueyapan was founded by people from Xochimilco around 902 CE, conquered by the Aztecs under Moctezuma II and in 1521, during the Spanish conquest of the Aztec Empire, it fell to the Gonzalo de Sandoval, assisted by female Conquistador María Estrada.

Between 1563 and 1573 the Dominican order constructed a convent dedicated to Santo Domingo in Hueyapan. The Convent is now an ex-convent functioning as the town's Catholic church. Fray Diego Durán stayed here for a while and is thought to have compiled much of the information for his Crónica here.

In colonial times Hueyapan was part of the encomienda originally given to the Estrada family, but was later laid directly under the Spanish throne. Until recently, access to Hueyapan from other communities was limited, but in the past twenty years infrastructure has made transport to and from Hueyapan much easier.

When Morelos became a state in 1869, Hueyapan was part of the municipality of Ocuituco, and then passed to Tetela del Volcan in 1937. On January 1, 2019, Hueyapan became an independent municipality.

In the 1970s and 1980s marijuana was produced in and around Hueyapan and the town received negative attention from the Mexican media. Government forces occupied the town for brief periods and arrested many citizens both rightfully and wrongfully.

The 2000 general election, in which Mario Soberanes (of the Nueva Alianza party) was elected president of the Municipality of Tetela del Volcán, was the first time a citizen of Hueyapan had been elected to this position, and was also the first time a local president came from a party other than the PRI. In 2012 Javier Montes became the second municipal president of Tetela del Volcan from the community of Hueyapan.

Hueyapan was devastated in the September 19, 2017 earthquake. Although no deaths were reported, between 80% and 90% of the homes were damaged, some 30% of which could not be repaired, and there were fallen rocks and damaged bridges on both highways that lead to the town.

In response to the COVID-19 pandemic in Mexico, Hueyapan temporarily blocked the entrances to the community in April 2020. Eight cases had been reported as of December 27, 2020.

A long-standing conflict between the "Concejo Municipal" and the "Concejo Mayor" led to violence on March 8-10, 2021. Two police vehicles were sequestered in Cuautla on March 8, which were then driven to Cuernavaca the next day. Police and dissidents battled in Cuernavaca, and councillor Lilia González Cortés was kidnapped and beaten in an attempt to get her to resign. Several police officers were wounded, residents were arrested, and lawyer Nava Espinosa, who had been beaten outside of his office, went missing. Later that evening, 16 people were arrested in Tepoztlán. Espinosa was still missing on March 10.

== Monastery ==
The monastery of Santo Domingo de Guzman is a UNESCO World Heritage Site. It is one of the monasteries closest to the volcano. It was founded by the Dominicans but its cloister was built of adobe and wood with a tile roof instead of stone. It disintegrated relatively quickly due to the elements and was abandoned. It remains mostly closed to this day. Only the atrium area is open to visitors and this closes by 1:00 pm each day. The austere facade of the main church survives and it has a notable Barorque niche.

== Notable people ==
- Diego Durán, Chronicler and vicar of Hueyapan in the late 16th century
- Modesta Lavana, indigenous healer and artisan

== Bibliography ==
- Barrios E., M. 1949. Textos de Hueyapan, Morelos. Tlalocan 3:53-75.
- Dakin, Karen and Ryesky, Diana. 1990. Morelos Nahuatl Dialects: Hypotheses on their historical divisions. Morelos en una economia global. Proceedings of the Congress in Cocoyoc, Morelos, November 19023, 1989. Submitted in January 1990
- The History of the Indies of New Spain by Diego Durán, translated, annoted and with introduction by Doris Heyden
- Friedlander, Judith. 1975. Being Indian in Hueyapan: A Study of Forced Identity in Contemporary Mexico. New York: Saint Martin's Press.
- Johansson, Patrick, Johansson, Patrick. 1989. El sistema de expresion reverencial en Hueyapan, Morelos. Tlalocan XI. 149-162
