= Modesta Lavana =

- Doña Modesta Lavana in 2009
- Born: February 24, 1929
- Died: December 13, 2010 (aged 81)

Modesta Lavana Pérez (February 24, 1929 – December 13, 2010) was an indigenous Nahua healer and activist from the town of Hueyapan, Morelos, Mexico. She was recognized as an important activist for indigenous rights and women's rights in Morelos, where she worked as a healer and as a legal translator of the Nahuatl language for the state of Morelos. She was also an authority on local ethnobotany, and on the usage of the temazcal sweat bath. Her traditional wool weavings on the backstrap loom were well known within the state of Morelos, and received many prizes.

As a child, as was common in that period, she was punished for speaking her native Nahuatl language in school, but she kept speaking it and eventually became a translator helping other speakers access their rights in the legal system of the state of Morelos. She is cited as a source of linguistic data in several articles about the variety of Nahuatl spoken in Hueyapan, Morelos.

She was trained as a nurse and was responsible for much of the medical treatment of the inhabitants of Hueyapan administering injections, treating wounds and delivering babies in her home, until the construction of an official clinic. In 1977, with the anthropologist Laurencia Alvarez, she published an account of her own experience with the folk-illness susto, which has come to be frequently cited within the literature on this illness.

== See also ==
- List of people from Morelos
