= Judith Friedlander =

American anthropologist

Judith Friedlander is a professor of anthropology at Hunter College in New York City. She is the acting director of Academic Programs and former Dean of Roosevelt House, as well as the former dean of The New School.

== Anthropology ==
Friedlander received a PhD from the University of Chicago in 1973. She is best known for her 1975 work Being Indian in Hueyapan, a study of indigenous Latin American life and culture in Hueyapan, Mexico, and her 1990 Vilna on the Seine about Jewish intellectuals in France. In the late 2010s, Friedlander worked on a book on the history of The New School entitled A Light in Dark Times: The New School for Social Research and Its University in Exile, released in February 2019. In the 1930s and 1940s, a group of Jewish scholars, mostly from Germany and France, and mostly social scientists, came to the US as refugees and began working at the New School. A number of these scholars, particularly those with expertise in politics, social theory and economic policy, went on to serve in the Roosevelt Administration.
