= Víctor Reymundo Nájera =

Mexican politician

- Born: 4 July 1955 (age 70); Ayala, Morelos, Mexico
- Occupation: Deputy
- Political party: PRD

Víctor Reymundo Nájera Medina (born 4 July 1955) is a Mexican politician affiliated with the Party of the Democratic Revolution (PRD). In 2012–2015 he served as a federal deputy in the 62nd Congress, representing the fifth district of Morelos.
