= Zacualpan de Amilpas =

Town in Morelos, Mexico

Coordinates: 18°47′01″N 98°45′34″W

Zacualpan Tzakualpan de Amilpas Zacualpan de Amilpas
- Town and Municipality
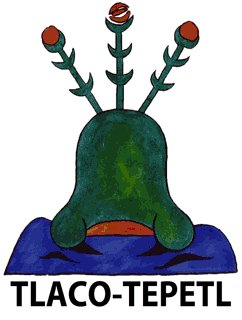
- Coat of arms

- Location in Mexico
- Country: Mexico
- State: Morelos
- Municipality: 1849

Government
  - President: Adrián Cázares González

Area
  - Total: 64 km^{2} (25 sq mi)
- Elevation: 1,636 m (5,367 ft)

Population (2015)
  - Total: 9,370
- Time zone: UTC-6 (Central Zone)
- Postal code: 62890
- Area code: 731
- Website: Official site (in Spanish)

Zacualpan de Amilpas is a town in the Mexican state of Morelos. The town serves as the municipal seat for the surrounding municipality, with which it shares a name. To the north is the municipality of Tetela del Volcán, to the south is the municipality of Temoac, to the east is the State of Puebla, and to the west are the municipalities of Ocuituco and Yecapixtla.

The municipality reported 9,370 inhabitants in the year 2015 census.

The toponym Zacualpan comes from a Nahuatl name: tzacual-li (covered thing) and pan (on top of); thus, "atop that which is covered". Amilpas refers to the 25 human settlements controlled by Moctezuma Ilhuicamina from his palace in Huaxtepec (Oaxtepec). The term continued to be used during the colonial era.

== Government and political division ==
Zacualpan de Amilpas is the municipal seat. It has 3,492 inhabitants and is located 1,640 metres (5,380 ft) above sea level. There are three preschools, three elementary schools (grades 1–6), and one middle school (grades 7–9). It is 81 kilometres (50 mi) from Cuernavaca and 136 kilometres (85 mi) from Mexico City. Its Sister City is Pharr, Texas.

Tlacotepec is the assistant municipal seat. It is 4.5 kilometres (2.8 mi) north of Zacualpan. It has 5,087 inhabitants or 60% of the population of the municipality. It is located 1,753 metres (5,751 ft) above sea level. There are three preschools, four elementary schools, two middle schools, one high school (grades 10–12).

Other communities are very small: Barrio de San Juan, Barrio de San Pedro, Barrio de San Nicolás, Colonia Guadalupe Victoria, Colonia San Andrés, Colonia Emiliano Zapata, Colonia Mariano Escobedo, and Colonia Panteón.

== History ==
=== Pre-Hispanic history ===
Researchers point to the Olmecs as the indigenous group who arrived in Zacualpan de Amilpas, considered the first inhabitants in the pre-Classic period between the years 1000 and 900 BCE. The second group to arrive were the Toltecs. Shortly after that, groups of Chichimecas and Chalcas arrived, founding new communities in Totolapan, Tepoztlán, Tlayacapan, and Zacualpan.

=== Conquest and colonialism ===
The Plan de Amilpas (Amilpas Plain) including Zacualpan was conquered by Captain Gonzalo de Sandoval on March 14, 1521. Francisco de Solis obtained several villages, including Zacualpan de Amilpas, Huazulco, Temoac. He planted orchards, cultivated wheat, and corn, and had beehives. In 1543 New Spain was organized into four provinces: Michoacán, México, Coatzacoalcos, and Las Mixtecas; the present territory of Morelos was part of the Mexico province.

The spiritual conquest of Zacualpan de Amilpas began in 1533 with the arrival of the provincial vicar, Fray Francisco de la Cruz, who ordered Jorge de Ávila and Jerónimo de San Esteban to evangelize the region. In 1535 the two monks began construction of a church and a convent to honor the Immaculate Conception of Mary next to the Amatzinac Canyon. The building was designed by Fray Juan de la Cruz, one of the best architects of the order of the Augustinian order. The church is small and rectangular. an octagonal apse, towering arches, and columns with a square section that supports the roof. The side Chapel of the Rosary dates from the 18th century and is covered by an octagonal dome. The main façade has a semi-circular arch framed by a pair of square pilasters, with molded capital. Above the pilasters is a frieze and cornice molding in Renaissance architecture style. Higher up, there is a small rectangular window and a late 19th-century clock and the west side. The belltower, located in the northwestern corner, is rectangular. On the southwest there are three different-sized semicircular arches forming an open chapel. The monastery and cloister is austere and simple. The central courtyard has walls, arches, buttresses, and cornices of quarry stonework, such as in Jantetelco and Oaxtepec. The atrium was built on a higher level than that of the street, indicating that the complex is located on the pre-Hispanic foundation. The fence is at the level of the atrium, but from the street, it is quite high.

The haciendas of San Nicolás in Zacualpan, Cuentepec, Chicomocelo were established in the 16th century.

In 1646 the province of México became the Real Audiencia; Cuautla became an alcaldia (mayoralty) belonging to the Intendencia of Puebla. In 1786, José Gálvez, supported by King Carlos II, divided Nueva España into two comandancias or zones, besides establishing three governments and twelve intendencias.

=== 19th century ===
The municipality originally belonged to the Intendencia de Puebla, but when the municipalities of Tlapa and Iguala were exchanged with the State of Mexico, the Alcaldía Mayor de Cuautla kept Zacualpan de Amilpas. The municipality was created in 1849 when Zacualpan refused subservience to Cuernavaca. In 1869, upon the creation of the State of Morelos, Zacualpan formed part of the District of Cuautla de Amilpas.

=== Revolution and the 20th century ===
The Constitution of 1857 was designed to end the abuses of the Church and other large landowners, but it failed. During the Mexican Revolution, many men from Zacualpan joined the Zapatistas and supported the Plan de Ayala. Zapata defended education as it was designed by Antonio Díaz Soto y Gama, who ordered the establishment of schools in Tochimilco, Puebla, Jantetelco and Zacualpan de Amilpas. The temple and ex-convent were used as military barracks by federal troops as well as revolutionary ones.

On December 17, 1937, the walls of the ex-convent in Zacualpan de Amilpas and elsewhere were cracked during an earthquake, convincing people that steps were needed to preserve historical monuments. A law was passed on June 9, 1939, that declared colonial convents national monuments and providing for their preservation.

Differences between Zacualpan and surrounding communities led to the establishment of Temoac as a municipality on March 17, 1977.

=== 21st century ===
The (7.1M_{w}) September 19, 2017 earthquake destroyed most of Zacualpan, which is 39.3 kilometres (24.4 mi) from Axochiapan, the epicenter. At least 73 people died in Morelos.

Roberto Adrian Cazares Gonzalez of Por Morelos al Frente (Morelos First coalition) was elected Presidente Municipal (mayor) on July 1, 2018.

When the federal Pueblos Magicos program was canceled in 2019, the state of Morelos established its own program to promote tourism, called Pueblos Encantados ("Charmed Towns"). Zacualpan de Amilpas was the first town in Morelos to become a part of this program.

During the COVID-19 pandemic in Mexico, as of May 10, there were 812 infections and 106 deaths in the state of Morelos but none in Zacualpan. Zacualpan was the only municipality in the state without reported cases. On July 2, Zacualpan reported one infection but no deaths from the virus; the reopening of the state was pushed back until at least June 13. Zacualpan reported 12 cases, ten recuperations, and one death from the virus as of August 31. Twenty-six cases were reported on December 27, 2020.

=== Municipal presidents ===
The following is a list of municipal presidents from 1958 to the present:

- Agustín López Amado, 1958–1961
- Buenaventura Juárez Barreto, 1962–1964
- Antioco García Neri, 1964–1967
- Irineo Vidal Vega, 1967–1970
- Reyes Martínez Amado, 1976–1979
- Juan García Barreto Vidal, 1976–1979
- David Anzurez Sandoval, 1976–1979
- José García Neri, 1979–1982
- Angel García Barreto, 1982–1985
- Roberto Baheza Sánchez, 1985–1988
- Félix Vidal Vidal, 1988–1991
- Gonzalo Cerezo Vargas, 1991–1994
- Gonzalo Barreto Vázquez, 1994-1997 (PRI)
- Ofelio Barreto Canizal, 1997–2000
- Alberto González Tlacota, 2000–2003
- Erik Martinez Sánchez, 2003-2006 (PRD)
- Irineo González Tlacotla, 2006-2009 (PRI)
- Ángel García Yañez, 2009-2012 (PVEM)
- Clemente Barreto Turijan 2013–2015, (PRI)
- Zenon Barreto Ramos, 2016-2018 (PRI)
- Roberto Adrian Cazares Gonzalez (Por Morelos al Frente "Morelos First").

== Historical sites and monuments ==
- Convento de la Inmaculada Concepción de Zacualpan de Amilpas was built by Augustinians in the 16th century. It was declared a World Heritage site by UNESCO in 1994.
- Hacienda de Chicomocelo was built by Jesuits in Tlacotepec in the 17th century, but is largely in ruins.
- Church of Nuestra Señora de la Asunción
- Hacienda of San Nicolás Cuautepec was built by Jesuit friars in the 16th century in order to fund a school in Mexico City. An aqueduct was constructed to provide water for irrigation of the sugar cane fields. Since 1975, Technical High School #12 of the municipality of Zacualpan de Amilpas has occupied the site.
- Xolozuchitl Museum in Tlacotepec.

== Traditions and culture ==
There is a barter fair and Tianguis (from Nahua "Tianquiztli") tradition in Zacualpan de Amilpas that goes back to 700 BCE. Every Sunday morning, people from Zacualpan and neighboring communities such as Tetela del Volcán, Temoac, Ocuituco, Hueyapan, and Yecapixtla gather outside the church to trade farm goods, animals, and handicrafts.

There is a fair in Tlacotepec from August 12−16 for the Assumption of Mary. There is a festival in Zacualpan on the second Sunday of October in honor of the Our Lady of the Rosary. These events are accompanied by brass bands and Chinelos (dancers).

Traditional foods include green mole of pepita (pipián); tamales de ceniza (ashes); red mole with turkey; cecina with cream, cheese, and green sauce; and barbecued goat. Zacualpan de Amilpas is famous for its aguardiente.

== Geography ==
=== Location, altitude, and area ===
Zacualpan de Amilpas is located in the northeast of Morelos, at 98° 46' West longitude and 18°47' North latitude, at an altitude of 1,640 meters (5,380 feet) above sea level. It borders Tetela del Volcán on the north, Temoac on the south, Ocuituco and Yecaplixtla to the west, and the State of Puebla to the east. It has an area of 53.77 km^{2} (20.76 sq mi).

==== Distances and highways ====
- Tlotocapec: north 4.6 kilometres (2.9 mi) (9 minutes)
- Amayuca: south 8.2 kilometres (5.1 mi) (14 minutes)
- Jantetelco: south 10.2 kilometres (6.3 mi) (19 minutes)
- Cuautla, Morelos: southwest 29.5 kilometres (18.3 mi) (39 minutes) via Mexican Federal Highway 160
- Cuernavaca: west 80.9 kilometres (50.3 mi) (1 hour, 27 minutes) via Mexican Federal Highway 160 and Mexican Federal Highway 115 or 122 kilometres (76 mi) (1 hour, 32 minutes) via Mexican Federal Highway 95D
- Puebla: east 78.9 kilometres (49.0 mi) (1 hour, 19 minutes) via Chipancingo and Mexican Federal Highway 95D
- Mexico City: northwest 135.9 kilometres (84.4 mi) (2 hours, 8 minutes) via Mexican Federal Highway 95D or 131 kilometres (81 mi) (2 hours, 12 minutes) via Mexican Federal Highway 150D or 153 kilometres (95 mi) (2 hours 33 minutes) via Mexican Federal Highway 57D

=== Relief and water resources ===
Zacualpan de Amilpas is in the foothills of the Popocatépetl Volcano; among the hills, there are deep, boxy ravines. The soils are a volcanic eruptive type. There are several streams including Amatzinac River, which has its source in the vicinity of the Popocatepetl volcano. Five streams are located in Tlacotepec. There is a small dam on the Amatzinac in the town of Zacualpan.

=== Climate ===
The climate is semi-warm all year round, and semi-humid in the spring. The average temperature is 19.7 °C (67.5 °F) and the average annual rainfall is 943 millimetres (37.1 inches).

=== Fauna and flora ===
The flora of the municipality consists principally of low deciduous forest, of warm climate; jacarandá (a flowering tree), tabachín del monte (Mexican holdback), casahuate (a thorny tree), seiba, copal (traditionally used for incense), zomplantle (a medicinal plant) and bougainvillea. Animals include raccoon, Coati (similar to a raccoon), skunk, armadillo, hare, rabbit, coyote, wildcat, weasel, opossum, and bats, flag bird, chachalaca (a rather noisy bird), copetona magpie, buzzard, aura, raven, owl, and songbirds.

== Economy ==
Zacualpan de Amilpas is primarily an agricultural area. The major crops are sorghum, beans, and corn. There are orchards with guava, papaya, and peaches. Cattle, pork, sheep, horses, and fowl are raised on ranches. Commerce and services are less important. The volcanic rocks in the area are mined.

== See also ==
- List of people from Morelos
