= Francisco Tomás Rodríguez Montero =

Mexican politician

- Born: 5 November 1943 (age 82); Cuautla, Morelos, Mexico
- Occupation: Deputy
- Political party: PRD

Francisco Tomás Rodríguez Montero (born 5 November 1943) is a Mexican politician affiliated with the PRD. As of 2013 he served as Deputy of the LXII Legislature of the Mexican Congress representing Morelos.
