= Temoac =

Town and municipality in the Mexican state of Morelos

- Town and Municipality
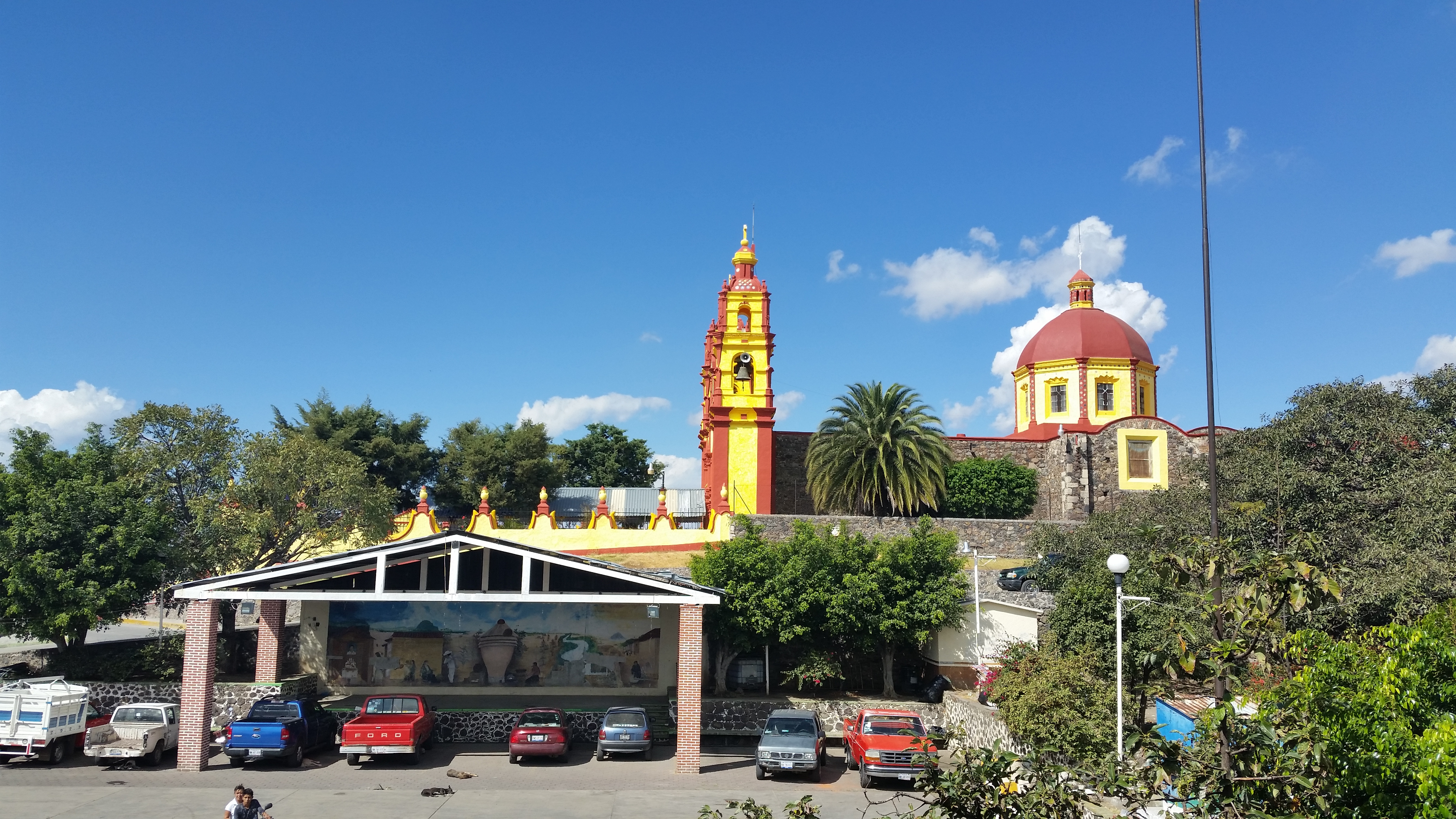

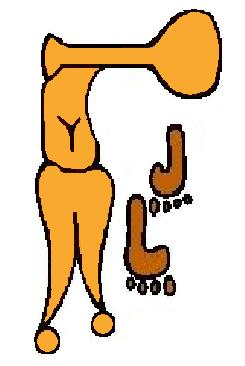
- Coat of arms

- Location in Mexico Temoac (Mexico)
- Coordinates: 18°45′26″N 98°47′34″W
- Country: Mexico
- State: Morelos

Government
  - Municipal president: Vacant
  - Federal electoral district: Morelos's 3rd
- Demonym: (in Spanish)
- Time zone: UTC−6 (Zona Centro)

Temoac is a town in the Mexican state of Morelos.

The town serves as the municipal seat for the surrounding municipality, with which it shares a name. Temoac comes from Nahuatl and means Temog-a (descend), Atl (water), Ko (adverb of place); "place where water descends".

The municipality called Temoac has the following boundaries: to the north with the municipalities of Yecapixtla and Zacualpan de Amilpas; to the south with Jonacatepec and Jantetelco; to the west with Ciudad Ayala and to the east with the state of Puebla. The municipality reported 15,844 inhabitants in 2015 census.

== History ==
In pre-Hispanic times, the region where the municipality of Temoac is located today was tributary to the Acolhuas of Texcoco, later to the Triple Alliance formed by the Mexicas, Acolhuas and Tepanecas. Later in the colonial period, several sugar estates were built in the region. El Trapiche de Chicomocelo, established around the year 1600 in the town of Tlacotepec, was part of the acquisitions made by the Society of Jesus, a religious who in just 69 years owned 82 haciendas. In spite of the benefits that the exploitation of the cane generated, the trapiches (refineries) were demolished by the Maximum School of San Pedro and Pablo in 1732 and switched to wheat production.

The municipal government building served as an elementary school for the children of Temoac in the 19th and early 20th centuries.

The Emiliano Zapata rural normal school was created in Amilcingo on 18 October 1973. While the school has always tried to promote values to young teachers, since its beginning, the school has been plagued by underfinancing, hazing, and violence.

Differences between Zacualpan de Amilpas and surrounding communities led to the establishment of Temoac as a municipality on 17 March 1977.

Valentín Lavín Romero, the candidate of the Green Party (PVEM), was elected municipal president (mayor) in the election of 1 July 2018. Several of his family members were murdered on 13 September 2018. Temoac has been plagued with crime and violence; citizens of Temoac and neighboring municipalities in 2018 established extra-legal self-defense organizations due to threats from drug dealers. Lavín survived multiple attacks, but was assassinated on 22 July 2026 while helding the municipal presidency.

Samir Flores, an activist and radio announcer from Amalcingo who opposed the construction of the thermoelectric plant in Huexca, Yecapixtla, was murdered on 20 February 2019, only three days prior to the proposed referendum on the project. The referendum on the $22 billion peso (US$16 billion) plant was approved 59.1% in favor to 40.1% opposed by voters in Morelos, Puebla, and Tlaxcala, although the voting in Temoac was canceled due to violence.

The state of Morelos reported 209 cases and 28 deaths due to the COVID-19 pandemic in Mexico, as of 27 April 2020. Schools and many businesses were closed from mid March until 1 June. The state office of DIF sent food and water to vulnerable groups of people in eight municipalities including Temoac on 26 May. On 2 July, Temoac reported 32 infections and eight deaths from the virus; the reopening of the state was pushed back until at least 13 June. Temoac reported 13 cases, six recuperations, and four deaths from the virus as of 31 August. Twenty-seven cases were reported on 27 December 2020.

== Points of Interest ==
Catholic churches: Church of the Lord of the Column (del Cerrito), which is well-preserved; church of San José, church of San Martín Obispo in the municipal seat, church of Santa Catarina de Alejandra in Huazulco, church of Santa María Magdalena, and church of Santo Tomas Apóstole, in Popotlán.

Visitors will enjoy La hacienda de Santa Lucía. and the Feria Tradicional de Huazulco (traditional fair) in Santa Catarina, held from 24 to 26 November.

== Communities ==
The communities that make up Temoac are Popotlán (Barrio Santo Tomás), population 839; Huazulco, population 3,847; Amilcingo, population 3,515; and Temoac (municipal seat) population 5,799.

== Geography ==
Temoac is located at 18°45′26.28″ N, 98°47′34.08″ W, at an average height of 1,583 meters above sea level. It is in the eastern part of the state of Morelos, bound by Zacualpan de Amilpas and Yecapixtla to the north, the state of Puebla to the east, Ayala to the west, and Jonacatepec and Jantetelco to the south. Its area is 37.04 km^{2}, representing 0.92% of the total of the state. Important heights include the hill of Tencuacoalco (1,770 meters); the hill of Tenango or El Gordo, (1,500 meters), and the Mirador, the Colorado and La Playa. It is 85 km (53 mi) from Cuernavaca, 130 km (81 mi) from Mexico City, 78 km (48 mi) from the city of Puebla, and 28 km (17 mi) from Cuautla.

The Amatzinac or Tenango River is the most important in the municipality. Its source is in the Popocatépetl volcano; several small dams have been built to store the waters for irrigation. The climate of Temoac is temperate subhumid, with rains in summer and with an average annual temperature of 19.8°C. The rainy season is May–October, with an annual average of 1,693 millimeters (66.7 in).

Flora is constituted mainly by low deciduous forest of warm climate: jacarandas, Mexican holdbacks, cazahuates, ceiba, and bougainvilleas. Wildlife consists of white-tail deer, boars, raccoons, badgers, skunks, armadillos, hares, common rabbits, coyotes, wildcats, weasels, cacomistles (a raccoon-like animal), magpies, buzzards, ravens, owls, and songbirds.

Images from Temoac, Morelos

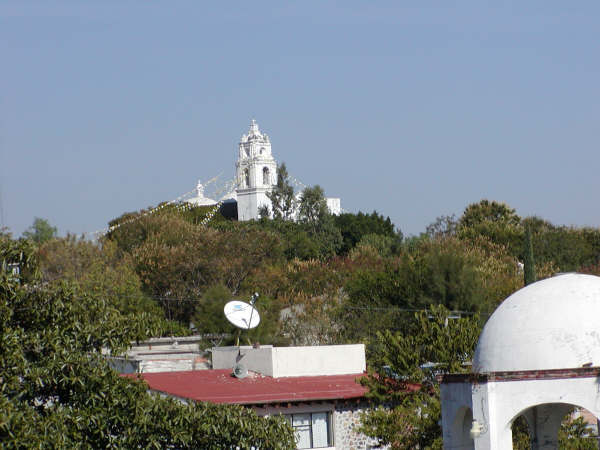

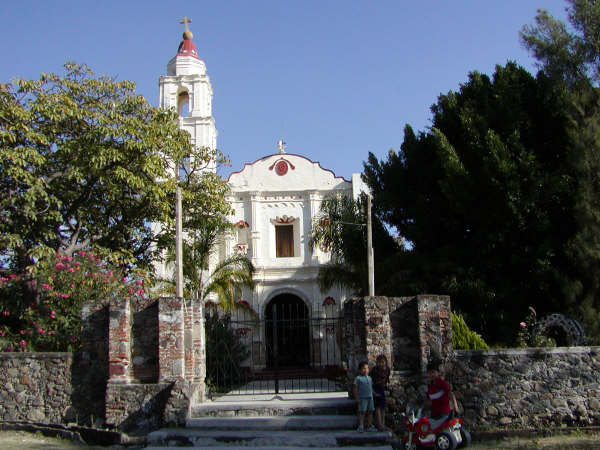

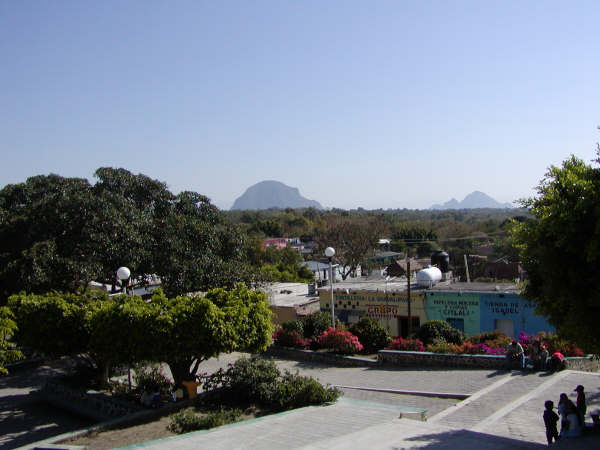

== See also ==
- List of people from Morelos
