= Guillermo del Valle =

Mexican politician

- Born: 28 February 1964 (age 62); Ciudad Ixtepec, Oaxaca, Mexico
- Education: UAEM
- Occupation: Politician
- Political party: PRI

Guillermo del Valle Reyes (born 28 February 1964) is a Mexican politician affiliated with the Institutional Revolutionary Party. He served as Deputy of the LIX Legislature of the Mexican Congress representing Morelos, as well as the Congress of Morelos.
