= Jaime Sánchez Vélez =

Mexican politician

- Born: 16 July 1962 (age 63); Morelos, Mexico
- Occupation: Politician
- Political party: PRI

Jaime Sánchez Vélez (born 16 July 1962) is a Mexican politician from the Institutional Revolutionary Party (PRI). From 2009 to 2012 he served as a federal deputy in the 61st Congress, representing the fifth district of Morelos.
