= Félix Rodríguez Sosa =

Mexican politician

- Born: 25 August 1952 (age 73); Morelos, Mexico
- Occupation: Politician
- Political party: PRI

Luis Félix Rodríguez Sosa (born 25 August 1952) is a Mexican politician from the Institutional Revolutionary Party. From 2009 to 2012 he served as Deputy of the LXI Legislature of the Mexican Congress representing Morelos.
