= Ocuituco =

- Municipality
- Location in Mexico Ocuituco (Mexico)
- Country: Mexico
- State: Morelos
- Demonym: (in Spanish)
- Time zone: UTC−6 (CST)

Ocuituco is a town in the Mexican state of Morelos and the municipal head for the Municipality of Ocuituco which includes the towns of Ocuituco, Huejotengo, Huecahuaxco, Huepalcalco, Metepec, and Ocoxaltepec, as well as a number of settlements with fewer than 300 inhabitants. The name comes from Nahuatl Okuiltoco and means Where there are weevils. It is one of the 36 municipalities of the state of Morelos. To the north of Ocuitico is México State, southeast is Zacualpan, east is Tetela del Volcán, and southwest is Yecapixtla. It stands at 18°52′N 98°46′W, at 1,920 meters above sea level. It is considered one of the municipalities of the "Los altos de Morelos" (Morelos highlands).

== History ==
During the epiclassic and early postclassic periods, Ocuituco was inhabited by Olmeca-Xicallancas. By the late postclassic, it was inhabited by Xochimilcas, contrasting with most of the rest of Morelos where the people were Tlahuica. Local products included wood and flowers. After being conquered by the Aztec Empire, Ocuituco became the capital of a strategic province. Ocuituco was subject to Xochimilco. In turn, Jumiltepec, Ecatzingo, Hueyapan, Itzlan (near modern Metepec) and Nepopoalco (near modern Tlalmimilulpan) were all subject to Ocuituco. Together they fought wars against Huejotzingo, Huaquechula and Atlixco, and Diego Durán claims that this was because the latter city-states wanted to steal a large jade idol. The province of Ocuituco also included Tlacotepec, Zacualpan, Temoac, Huazulco and Amayuca to the south.

After the Spanish Conquest, Hernan Cortés received the submission of the Cacique of Ocuituco. During the Colonial era, Ocuituco was one of the few towns subtracted from the Marquessate of the valley of Oaxaca and was commissioned to Fray Juan de Zumarraga in the year of 1548, as a means of financing the traveling expenses of the monks arriving from Spain. At a later time, the town of Jumiltepec was used for this purpose.

After the historical siege of Cuautla in 1812, José María Morelos y Pavón took to the town of Ocuituco to regroup his forces, and then to Chiautla, where he defeated the Spanish chief París.

Ocuituco was one of the most severely affected municipalities during the September 19, 2017 earthquake. 74 people died in Morelos including several in the Ocuituco. 529 homes were destroyed and another 511 were damaged in the municipality.

Juan Jesus Anzures Garcia of Ecologist Green Party of Mexico (PVEM) was elected Presidente Municipal (mayor) in the election of July 1, 2018. One of the biggest concerns is the high rate of crime and violence.

The state of Morelos reported 209 cases and 28 deaths due to the COVID-19 pandemic in Mexico as of April 27, 2020; six cases were reported in Ocuituco. Schools and many businesses were closed from mid March until June 1. On June 2, Ocuituco reported 15 confirmed cases and two deaths from the virus; the reopening of the state was pushed back until at least June 13. Ocuituco reported 34 cases, 28 recuperations, and five deaths from the virus as of August 31. Sixty-six cases were reported on December 27, 2020.

== Population ==
The municipality reported 18,580 inhabitants in the year 2015 census. Fewer than 1% speak a native indigenous language.

== Geography ==
Ocuitico has a semi-warm sub-humid climate, with rains starting in summer (From June to October), with medium humidity (75.16%).

Over 70% of the economy consists of agricultural activities, mainly for corn, peaches, and avocados.

== Communities ==
Ocuituco is the municipal seat. It has 4,846 inhabitants and stands at 1,919 meters above sea level. There are three preschools, two elementary schools (grades 1−6), one middle school (grades 7−9), and one high school (grades 10−12). Sister city: Pharr, Texas

Ocoxaltepec has 1,338 inhabitants. Ocoxaltepec is located at 2352 meters above sea level. There is one preschool, one elementary school, and one middle school.

== See also ==
- List of people from Morelos
