= Tetela del Volcán =

- Municipality
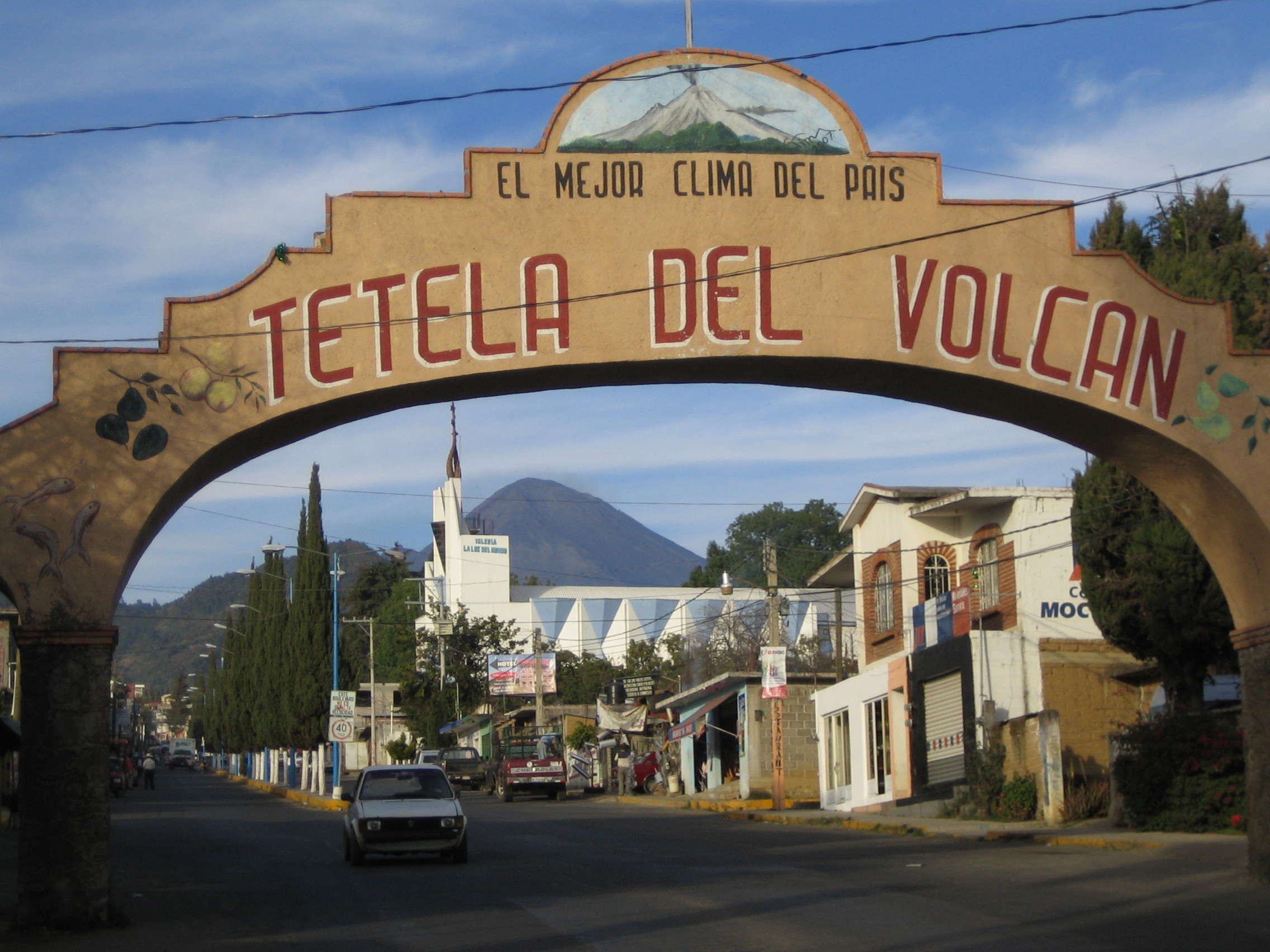

- Location in Mexico Tetela del Volcán (Mexico)
- Country: Mexico
- State: Morelos
- Demonym: (in Spanish)
- Time zone: UTC−6 (CST)

Tetela del Volcán or simply Tetela, is a town and municipal seat of the municipality of Tetela del Volcán in the Mexican state of Morelos. It is located on the slopes of the volcano Popocatépetl. 18°57′48″N 99°15′12″W. The city serves as the municipal seat for the surrounding municipality of the same name. It is notable for its sixteenth century Dominican ex-convent which together with a number of other early monasteries nearby in the area has been declared a UNESCO World Heritage Site. The municipality reported 20,698 inhabitants in the year 2015 census. Other towns in the municipality of Tetela del Volcán include Hueyapan, Xochicalco (not to be confused with the archeological site of the same name) and Tlamimilulpan.

The toponym Tetela comes from Nahuatl and means "place of rocks". The Volcán ("volcano") referred to is, of course, Popocatépetl.

== History ==
In 1503, Tetela del Volcán and nearby Hueyapan were subjugated to the Aztec Empire by Moctezuma II. The first Spaniards to arrive in Tetela were Bernardino Vázquez de Tapia and Pedro de Alvarado in 1519. After the fall of Tenochtitlán Cortés arrived in Tetela del Volcán, where he found the Indians to be resistant and fierce. According to Diego Durán their subjugation was achieved only thanks to the intervention of María Estrada and her husband Pedro Sánchez Farfán, for which Cortés awarded the couple the lands of Tetela as an encomienda. In 1561 this encomienda was revoked and laid under the Spanish Crown directly, and in the Relacion Geográfica from 1665 this "realengo" appears to be administrated by corregidor Cristóbal Martínez de Maldonado.

In the 17th century, the indigenous authorities were still functioning to a large extent (Gibson) and the Spanish and native government coexisted for a while as separate systems.

In 1784, Tetela del Volcán was incorporated into the Subdelegación de Cuautla and lost its status as "cabecera" (capital) of the district. When the administrative structure of corregimientos and alcaldías was abolished, Tetela lost its special status.

When the state of Morelos was first established, Tetela del Volcán belonged to the municipality of Ocuituco. It was established as a separate municipality on January 31, 1937, during the government of Lázaro Cárdenas. During the early period of PRI governance, municipal presidents were mostly appointed by the state governor.

After the 2006 Mexican election, Mario Soberanes (Nueva Alianza) was elected municipal president and became the first citizen of Hueyapan to be elected president of the municipality. He was also the first municipal president from a party other than the Institutional Revolutionary Party since the municipality's founding.

There were two major earthquakes in 2017. The Chiapas earthquake on September 7 did not cause any damage in Morelos, but the 2017 Puebla earthquake centered in Axochiapan twelve days later killed 74 people in the state and caused physical damage to 20,000 buildings. Tetela del Volcán was the municipality with most severe damage, with 831 homes destroyed and 1,058 damaged.

In response to the COVID-19 pandemic in Mexico, Tetela del Volcan blocked the entrances to the community. The state of Morelos reported 1,238 cases and 248 deaths due to the COVID-19 pandemic in Mexico as of May 25, 2020; eight cases were reported in Tetela del Volcán. Schools and many businesses were closed from mid March until June 1. The state office of DIF sent food and water to vulnerable groups of people in eight municipalities including Tetela del Volcán on May 26. On July 2, Tetela del Volcán reported four infections but no deaths from the virus; the reopening of the state was pushed back until at least June 13. Tetela reported 28 cases, 23 recuperations, and 5 deaths from the virus as of August 31. Forty-seven cases were reported on December 27, 2020.

== Monastery ==
The monastery of San Juan Bautista in Tetela del Volcán is one of the Monasteries on the slopes of Popocatépetl and a UNESCO world heritage site. It was built by the Dominicans in the first half of the 16th century and was even visited by Hernán Cortés. The exterior has arcades that surround the complex but are partially hidden by trees. The upper parts of the walls around the complex are covered in paint, the lower floor of the cloister has figures depicted in the arches and walls. In the vaults over the walkways, there are numerous cherubs defeating evil spirits and some even fighting with each other. One unique architectural element is the Moorish-style wood beam roofing in the sacristy.

== Communities ==
Sister city: Pharr, Texas

== Municipal Presidents ==
Name	Period of presidency
Pompeyo Montero Rodríguez (PRI)	1958-1960
Venancio Anzurez Mendoza (PRI)	1961-1963
Carlos Pérez Solís (PRI)	1964-1966
Anselmo Martínez Reyes (PRI)	1967-1970
Ladislao Trujillo Arenas (PRI)	1970-1973
León Montero Rodríguez (PRI)	1973-1976
Rosendo Rodríguez García (PRI)	1976-1979
Silvano Ariza Mendoza (PRI)	1979-1982
Pablo Torres Mendoza (PRI)	1982-1985
Mario Jiménez Gutiérrez (PRI)	1985-1988
Vardomiano Vazaldua Carrillo (PRI)	1988-1991
Paulino Velázquez Álvarez (PRI)	1991-1994
Leopoldo Mendoza Lavín (PRI)	1994-1997
Leoncio Pérez Jiménez (PRI)	1997-2000
Antonio López Mendoza (PRI)	2000-2003
Jorge Lozada Martinez (PRI)	2003-2006
Mario Soberanes Perez (NA)	2006-2009
Jorge Hernandez Mendieta (PAN, previously PSD))	2009-2012
Javier Montes (PV, previously PAN and PT)	2012-2015
Ana Berta Haro Sánchez (NA)	2015-2018
Israel Gonzalez Perez (Juntos Haremos Historia: PT-Morena-ES)	2018-2021

== See also ==
- List of people from Morelos
