= 4th federal electoral district of Morelos =

Federal electoral district of Mexico

Morelos's 4th
- Electoral district of the Chamber of Deputies of Mexico

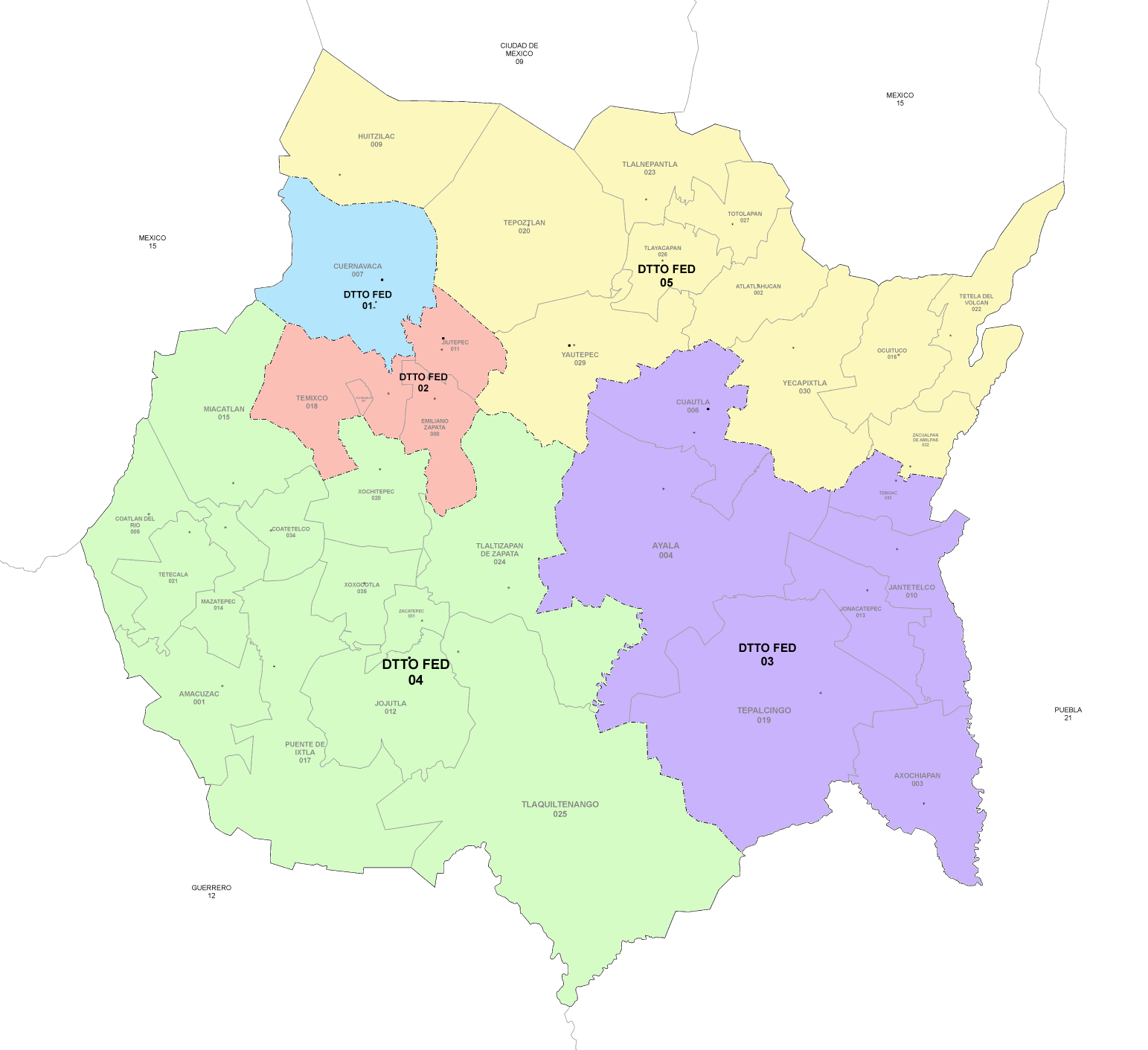
- 4th district

Incumbent
- Member: Juan Ángel Flores Bustamante
- Party: ▌Morena
- Congress: 66th (2024–2027)

District
- State: Morelos
- Head town: Los Pilares, Jojutla
- Coordinates: 18°37′N 99°12′W
- Covers: 13 municipalities: Amacuzac, Coatetelco, Coatlán del Río, Jojutla, Mazatepec, Miacatlán, Puente de Ixtla, Tetecala, Tlaltizapán de Zapata, Tlaquiltenango, Xochitepec, Zacatepec, Xoxocotla
- PR region: Fourth
- Precincts: 222
- Population: 394,422 (2020 census)

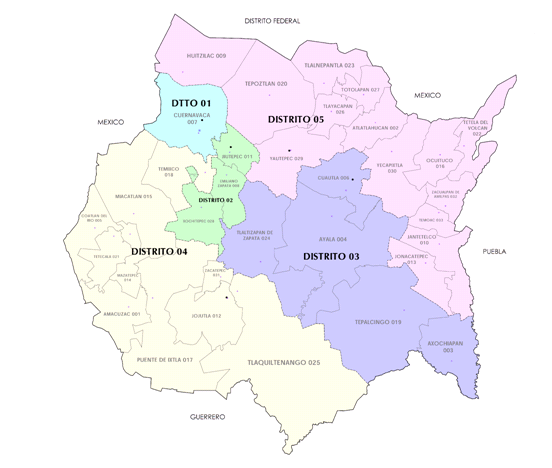
Morelos under the 2017–2022 districting plan

The 4th federal electoral district of Morelos (Spanish: Distrito electoral federal 04 de Morelos) is one of the 300 electoral districts into which Mexico is divided for elections to the federal Chamber of Deputies and one of five such districts in the state of Morelos.

It elects one deputy to the lower house of Congress for each three-year legislative period by means of the first-past-the-post system. Votes cast in the district also count towards the calculation of proportional representation ("plurinominal") deputies elected from the fourth region.

The 4th district was created through the 1977 electoral reforms, which increased the number of single-member seats in the Chamber of Deputies from 196 to 300. Under those reforms, Morelos's seat allocation rose from two to four. The two new districts were first contested in the 1979 mid-term election.

The current member for the district, elected in the 2024 general election, is Juan Ángel Flores Bustamante of the National Regeneration Movement (Morena).

== District territory ==
Under the 2023 districting plan adopted by the National Electoral Institute (INE), which is to be used for the 2024, 2027 and 2030 federal elections, the 4th district comprises 222 precincts (secciones electorales) across 13 municipalities in the south-west of the state:

- Amacuzac, Coatetelco, Coatlán del Río, Jojutla, Mazatepec, Miacatlán, Puente de Ixtla, Tetecala, Tlaltizapán de Zapata, Tlaquiltenango, Xochitepec, Zacatepec and Xoxocotla.

The head town (cabecera distrital), where results from individual polling stations are gathered together and tallied, is the town of Los Pilares in the municipality of Jojutla. The district reported a population of 394,422 in the 2020 census.

== Previous districting schemes ==
Evolution of electoral district numbers
	1974	1978	1996	2005	2017	2023
Morelos	2	4	4	5	5	5
Chamber of Deputies	196	300				

2017–2022

Under the scheme in force from 2017 to 2022, the 4th district's head town was at Jojutla and it comprised 10 municipalities:
- Amacuzac, Coatlán del Río, Jojutla, Mazatepec, Miacatlán, Puente de Ixtla, Temixco, Tetecala, Tlaquiltenango and Zacatepec.

2005–2017

Under the 2005 plan, which gave Morelos its fifth congressional seat, the district had its head town was at Jojutla and it covered 10 municipalities:
- Amacuzac, Coatlán del Río, Jojutla, Mazatepec, Miacatlán, Puente de Ixtla, Tetecala, Tlaquiltenango, Xochitepec and Zacatepec.

1996–2005

In the 1996 scheme, the head town was at Jojutla and the district comprised 11 municipalities:
- Amacuzac, Coatlán del Río, Jojutla, Mazatepec, Miacatlán, Puente de Ixtla, Tetecala, Tlaltizapán, Tlaquiltenango, Xochitepec and Zacatepec.

1978–1996

The districting scheme in force from 1978 to 1996 was the result of the 1977 electoral reforms, which increased the number of single-member seats in the Chamber of Deputies from 196 to 300. Under that plan, Morelos's seat allocation rose from two to four. The new 4th district covered 11 municipalities, with its head town at Jojutla:
- Amacuzac, Coatlán del Río, Jojutla, Mazatepec, Miacatlán, Puente de Ixtla, Tetecala, Tlaltizapán, Tlaquiltenango, Xochitepec and Zacatepec.

== Deputies returned to Congress ==
(Mexico) National parties
- Current
- PAN
- PRI
- PT
- PVEM
- MC
- Morena
- PAZ
- Somos
- Defunct or local only
- PLM
- PNR
- PRM
- PNM
- PP
- PPS
- PARM
- PFCRN
- CON
- PANAL
- PSD
- PES
- PES
- PRD

Morelos's 4th district
Election	Deputy	Party	Term	Legislature
1979	Lauro Ortega Martínez	Institutional Revolutionary Party	1979–1982	51st Congress
1982	Emma Victoria Campos Figueroa	Institutional Revolutionary Party	1982–1985	52nd Congress
1985	Rubén Román Sánchez	Institutional Revolutionary Party	1985–1988	53rd Congress
1988	Pablo Torres Chávez	Institutional Revolutionary Party	1988–1991	54th Congress
1991	Felipe Ocampo Ocampo	Institutional Revolutionary Party	1991–1994	55th Congress
1994	Gerardo Flores González	Institutional Revolutionary Party	1994–1997	56th Congress
1997	Jesús Flores Carrasco	Party of the Democratic Revolution	1997–2000	57th Congress
2000	Bernardo Pastrana Gómez	National Action Party (Mexico)	2000–2003	58th Congress
2003	Rosalina Mazari Espín	Institutional Revolutionary Party	2003–2006	59th Congress
2006	José Amado Orihuela Trejo	Institutional Revolutionary Party	2006–2009	60th Congress
2009	Rosalina Mazari Espín	Institutional Revolutionary Party	2009–2012	61st Congress
2012	Andrés Eloy Martínez Rojas	Party of the Democratic Revolution	2012–2015	62nd Congress
2015	Rosalina Mazari Espín	Institutional Revolutionary Party	2015–2018	63rd Congress
2018	Jorge Argüelles Victorero	Social Encounter Party	2018–2021	64th Congress
2021	Brenda Espinoza López	National Regeneration Movement	2021–2024	65th Congress
2024	Juan Ángel Flores Bustamante	National Regeneration Movement	2024–2027	66th Congress

== Presidential elections ==
Morelos's 4th district
Election	District won by	Party or coalition	%
2018	Andrés Manuel López Obrador	Juntos Haremos Historia	69.1654
2024	Claudia Sheinbaum Pardo	Sigamos Haciendo Historia	72.2431
