= Tropical Storm Chris (2024) =

Atlantic tropical storm in 2024

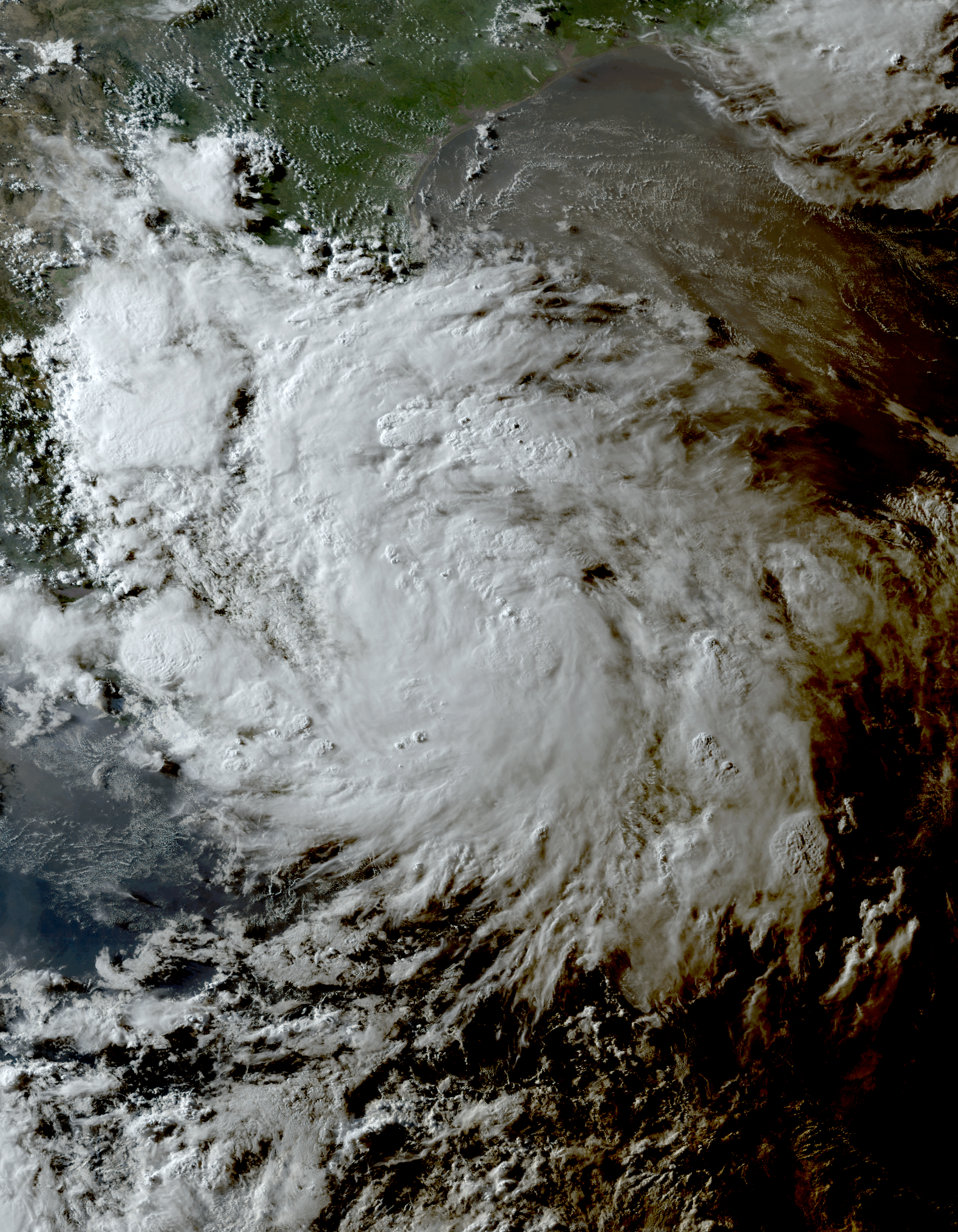
- Tropical Storm Chris near peak intensity as it approached the coast of Veracruz early on July 1

Meteorological history
- Formed: June 30, 2024
- Dissipated: July 1, 2024

Tropical storm
- 1-minute sustained (SSHWS/NWS)
- Highest winds: 45 mph (75 km/h)
- Lowest pressure: 1005 mbar (hPa); 29.68 inHg

Overall effects
- Fatalities: 6 (5 direct, 1 indirect)
- Damage: >$7.83 million (2024 USD)
- Areas affected: Mexico
- Part of the 2024 Atlantic hurricane season

Tropical Storm Chris was a weak and very short-lived tropical cyclone that brought heavy rainfall and flooding to parts of Mexico in early July 2024. The third named storm of the extremely active 2024 Atlantic hurricane season, Chris developed from a tropical wave that was first noted by the National Hurricane Center (NHC) on June 24. The wave struggled to organize as it moved westward across the Caribbean Sea and crossed the Yucatán Peninsula on June 30. Upon entering the Bay of Campeche, the wave coalesced into a tropical depression the same day. Located within a favorable environment for strengthening, it intensified into Tropical Storm Chris about six hours later. Shortly thereafter, Chris moved ashore near Alto Lucero, Veracruz. Chris rapidly weakened over the mountainous terrain of East Mexico and dissipated on July 1.

Chris prompted yellow alerts for northern and central Veracruz, later bringing heavy rainfall to parts of Mexico that had already been saturated by Tropical Storm Alberto earlier in June. Rainfall totals reached up to 11.5 in (292 mm) in Acatlán. Flooding occurred in parts of Veracruz, Tamaulipas, Hidalgo, and the State of Mexico, forcing the evacuation of dozens of households. A man was killed in San Salvador, Hidalgo, after a dwelling was buried by a mudslide. In addition, four police officers drowned in Tepetlán, Veracruz, during damage surveys after their vehicle was swept away by a river, and an elderly woman was fatally electrocuted in Tampico, Tamaulipas. In the aftermath of Chris, Plan DN-III-E, a disaster rescue and relief plan, was implemented in the State of Mexico to clear flooding from Lake Texcoco. Pumping equipment was also used to clear standing water from highways without drainage and victims of storm damage in Chiapas were provided with food and supplies. Damage from Chris totaled at least $7.83 million (2024 USD).

== Meteorological history ==
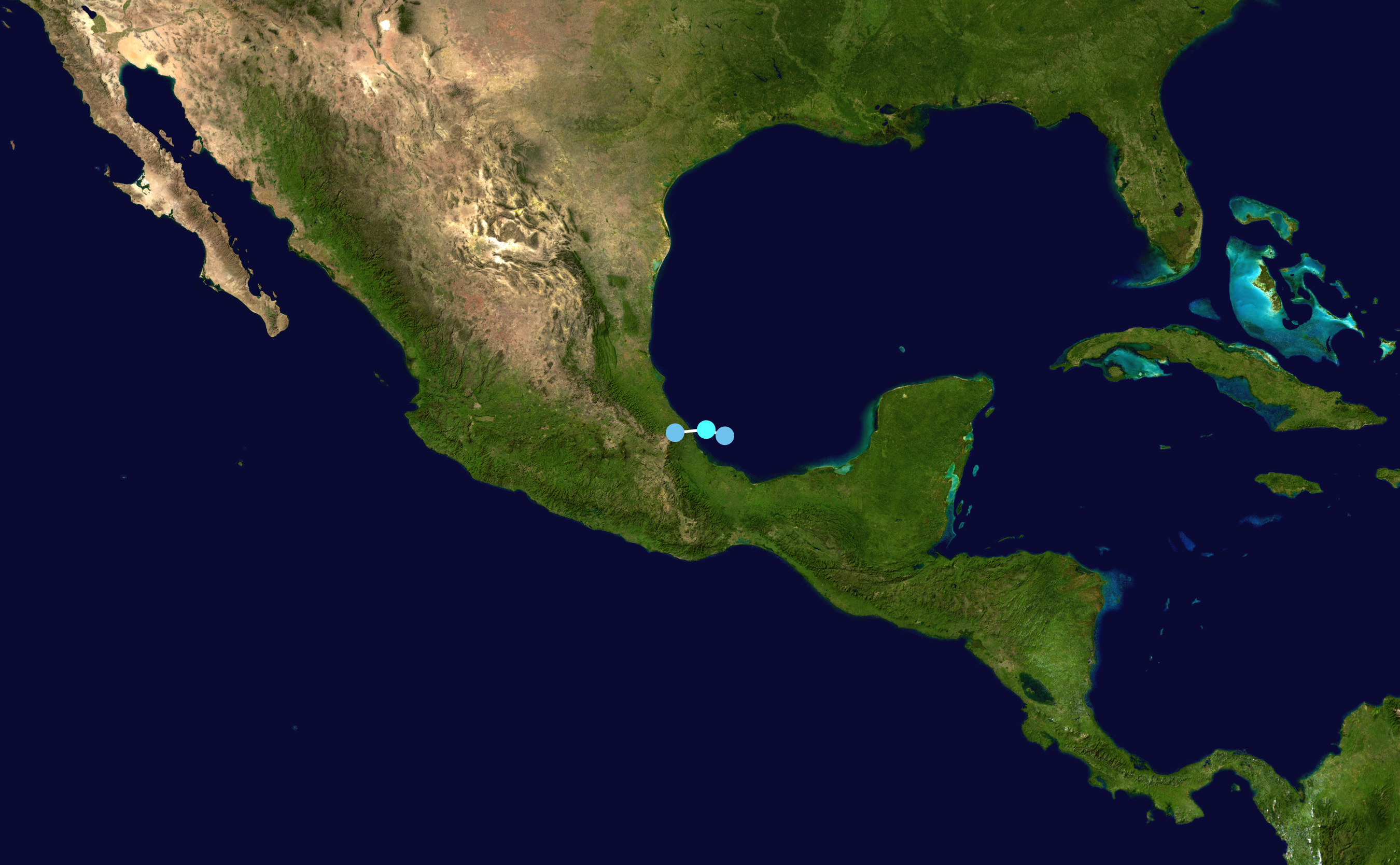
Map plotting the storm's track and intensity, according to the Saffir–Simpson scale Map key Saffir–Simpson scale Tropical depression (≤38 mph, ≤62 km/h) Tropical storm (39–73 mph, 63–118 km/h) Category 1 (74–95 mph, 119–153 km/h) Category 2 (96–110 mph, 154–177 km/h) Category 3 (111–129 mph, 178–208 km/h) Category 4 (130–156 mph, 209–251 km/h) Category 5 (≥157 mph, ≥252 km/h) Unknown Storm type Tropical cyclone Subtropical cyclone Extratropical cyclone, remnant low, tropical disturbance, or monsoon depression

The origins of Chris were traced to a low-latitude tropical wave emerged off the coast of West Africa on June 20 and entered the tropical Atlantic. The wave moved rapidly westward at forward of speeds of approximately 20 to 25 knots (23 to 29 mph). The National Hurricane Center (NHC) first began to monitor this tropical wave for potential tropical cyclogenesis at 18:00 UTC on June 24. Crossing the Windward Islands on June 25, the wave entered the Caribbean Sea. Although it produced convective activity, it was rather disorganized due to the storm's quick forward motion and the effects of strong deep-layer westerly wind shear. The wave moved westward across the Caribbean Sea, struggling to develop any signs of organization, before it crossed the Yucatán Peninsula and entered the Bay of Campeche during the early hours of June 30. After a Hurricane Hunters reconnaissance flight found sufficient organization at 18:00 UTC on June 30, the low-pressure area was declared Tropical Depression Three, while located roughly 65 miles (105 km) northeast of Veracruz, Mexico.

Around this time, curved bands began to form, and a large burst of convection developed close to the circulation center. Within a conducive environment, the depression was given a small window to intensify prior to landfall in Mexico. The storm was steered westward as it moved along the southern periphery of a mid-tropospheric ridge over the north-central Gulf Coast of the United States. Around six hours later, at 00:00 UTC on July 1, another Hurricane Hunters reconnaissance flight found sustained tropical-storm force winds in the cyclone, allowing the NHC to upgrade the system to Tropical Storm Chris. With an increase in convection on the eastern quadrant of the storm, Chris attained its peak intensity with maximum sustained winds of 45 mph (72 km/h) and a barometric pressure of 1005 mbar (29.68 inHg), as it moved ashore on the Mexican coastline near Alto Lucero, Veracruz, at around 03:00 UTC that day. During this time, most of the storm's highest winds were displaced to the east of the center. Chris rapidly weakened over the mountainous terrain of eastern Mexico, with the circulation of the storm dissipating by 12:00 UTC.

== Preparations ==
Satellite loop of Tropical Storm Chris making landfall in Veracruz early on July 1

Ahead of Chris's impacts in Mexico, the Government of Mexico issued a tropical storm warning from Cabo Rojo to Puerto Veracruz. The Servicio Meteorológico Nacional asked residents and tourists to heed weather warnings issued by authorities and noted the threat of heavy rainfall and rough waves. A yellow alert was issued for northern and central Veracruz. The remainder of Veracruz, northern and eastern Hidalgo, northern Puebla, southeastern San Luis Potosí, and southeastern Tamaulipas were placed under a green alert. A blue alert was in effect for remaining parts of Hidalgo and Puebla, as well as parts of Oaxaca, Tamaulipas, Tlaxcala, and Tabasco. Classes were suspended in 41 municipalities in Veracruz. The government of Veracruz opened nine emergency shelters, which housed 86 people. In Chiapas, the threat of mudslides triggered the evacuation of 645 people in Siltepec, and plans to relocate them permanently due to the future risk of mudslides were made.

== Impact ==
=== Mexico ===
==== Veracruz ====
As Chris moved ashore in Veracruz, a peak precipitation amount of 11.5 in (292 mm) was recorded in Acatlán. Flooding damaged close to 2,000 homes in Huilopan. Over 600 homes were damaged by mudslides in Cerro Gentil and Omiquila. A family in Xalapa was buried in their house by another mudslide. Across Xalapa, 58 colonias sustained damage; there were also 42 reports of fallen trees and 47 reports of mudslides. Four people had to be rescued and 50 residents were evacuated. The city recorded 9.8 in (250 mm) of rainfall within 24 hours. A mudslide in Tlilapan damaged approximately 200 homes and main roads connecting to two colonias. The overflow of a stream affected 765 households in Isla, accounting for most of the homes destroyed in Veracruz. A bridge was swept away by a torrent stream in Tenantitla, isolating residents of the nearby villages of Tolico and Zapata. Following the storm, four police officers conducting damage surveys in Tepetlán drowned after their vehicle was swept away by the Río Seco and destroyed.

==== Tamaulipas ====
In Tamaulipas, Chris produced heavy rainfall, especially in the community of Ciudad Tula, which recorded its highest 48-hour rainfall rate in nearly 50 years. In Tampico, a total of 5.7 in (144 mm) of rainfall occurred within a 12-hour period. Flash floods knocked over fences and washed over streets. An unoccupied van was destroyed by a fallen fence in the Campbell district. A passenger bus was nearly swept into a canal, requiring the rescue of all 15 occupants. An elderly woman was fatally electrocuted in Tampico after attempting to clear water off her balcony. Flooding inundated homes as well as a hospital Ciudad Madero and formed a sinkhole under a street in the Nuevo Progreso district. Residents of Ciudad Madero were warned to not venture onto flooded roads due to the potential presence of crocodiles from overflowed lagoons and canals. A crocodile sighting, along with the weather conditions, forced the closure of a beach in the city. Six schools were closed in Ciudad Madero after floodwaters entered the facilities. A total of 10,274 households statewide lost electricity due to the storm.

==== Hidalgo ====
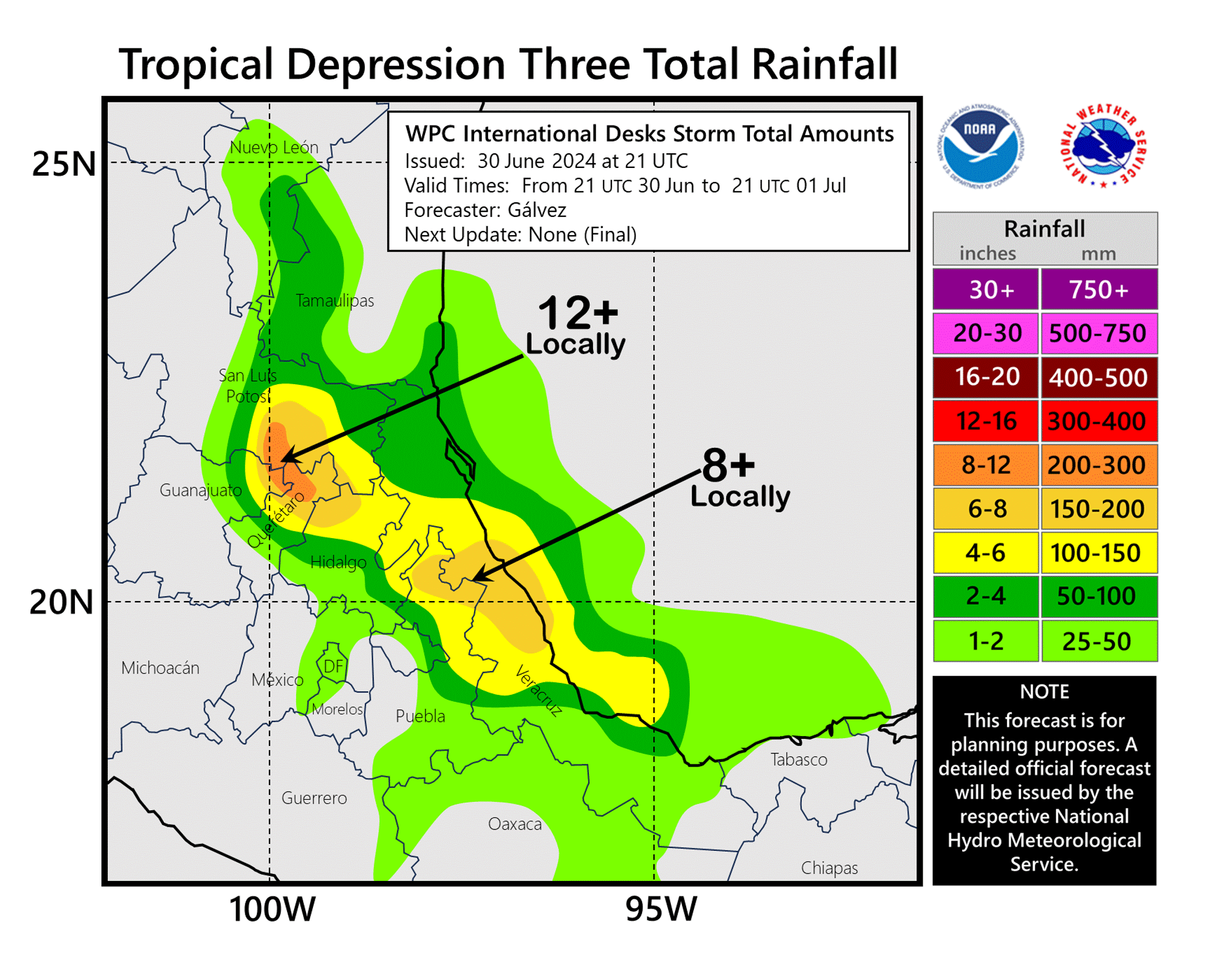
Rainfall totals forecast by the Weather Prediction Center on June 30

In Hidalgo, a man was killed in San Salvador after a house was buried by a landslide. More than 200 residents in Yahualica had to be rescued by helicopter after a river overtopped its banks. Flooding inundated numerous homes and a clinic in Xochiatipan, affecting more than 20,000 people. The Cosapa River overflowed in Zacualtipán, resulting in the evacuation of 30 families. Several roads in Huehuetla were blocked by mudslides. Statewide, 26 municipalities reported impacts from mudslides.

==== State of Mexico ====
In the State of Mexico, the Mexico-Puebla Highway became congested due to floods in Chalco de Díaz Covarrubias. The Circuito Exterior Mexiquense was also blocked by flooding between Texcoco and the municipalities of Nezahualcóyotl and Chimalhuacán. Classes at a technological university in Chimalhuacán were suspended due to inclement weather as the storm made landfall. Around 500 homes in the Piedras Negras neighborhood of Chimalhuacán were inundated by floodwaters. Over 500 dwellings at two colonias in Chicoloapan were flooded. The Papalotla River overflowed its banks near San Salvador Atenco, inundating 370 acres (150 ha) of cropland and flooding several homes.

==== Elsewhere ====
Heavy rainfall and flooding occurred due to Chris in Oaxaca, inundating streets in Tehuantepec. Power outages were reported in San Francisco del Mar and San Francisco Ixhuatán, where the Ostuta River began to rise. Classes were cancelled at all schools in En Juchitán after the Los Perros River began to rise as well. The Tacuba River overflowed its banks in San Pedro Yocnavil, affecting 28 households. Two ejidos in Frontera Comalapa suffered roof damage to houses. The Tembembe River in Morelos began to rise in the municipalities of Miacatlán, Mazatepec, and Puente de Ixtla. River flooding inundated a few homes and streets in these municipalities. In addition, overflowing ravines caused flooding and traffic disruptions in Miacatlan and Tetecala. A temporary market in Zacatepec was submerged by floodwaters from heavy rainfall. Fences and trees were downed in Cuernavaca, Jiutepec, Miacatlán, and Tlaltizapán, which resulted in clogged drains.

== Aftermath ==
By July 9, the accumulation of over two weeks of rainfall, including rain from Tropical Storm Chris, flooded a highway connecting Neza and Ecatepec in the State of Mexico, which lacked any form of drainage. To alleviate travel disruptions caused by the standing water, three water pumps and a 100-meter (328 ft) long hose were brought to remove the 60,000 liters (15,850 gallons) of water. Food and personal hygiene supplies were distributed to 100 families affected by the storm in Huehuetán, Chiapas, whom were also placed in shelters. Roof sheets were provided to the ejidos affected by roof damage in Frontera Comalapa. The civil protection of Cuyoaco, Puebla, distributed gallons of bleach, cleaning kits, hygiene kits, mats, and blankets to 75 individuals affected by power outages. Municipal authorities also used machinery to clear roads of debris and mud. The federal and state governments worked in conjunction to implement Plan DN-III to drain floodwaters in the neighborhood of Chimalhuacán. The flood was blamed on the construction of an excavated lane by Mexibús. Contractors had failed to install enough drainage systems to prevent an overflow of Lake Texcoco into the excavated lane that led to neighborhoods nearby.

The government of Veracruz made payouts totaling MX$144 million (US$7.83 million) to repair the damage caused by the storm while estimates from AON placed damage totals from Chris at multiple millions of dollars.

== See also ==
- Weather of 2024
- Tropical cyclones in 2024
- Other storms of the same name
- List of Mexico hurricanes
