= Coatetelco =

Coatetelco may refer to:

- Coatetelco, Morelos, a town in Mexico
- Coatetelco archaeological site, in Morelos, Mexico
