= Coatetelco archaeological site =

Archaeological site in Morelos, Mexico

Coatetelco
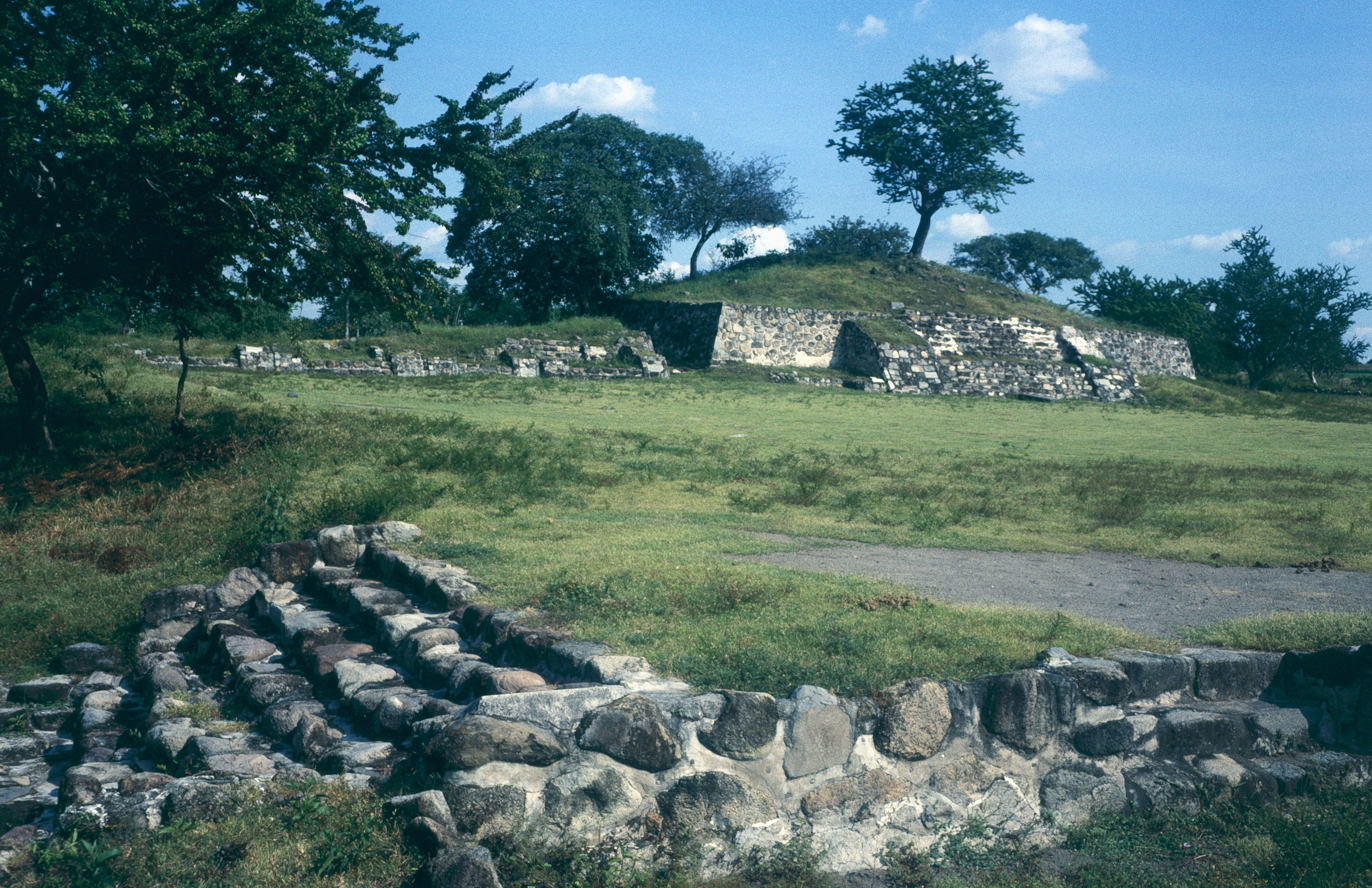
- Main pyramid
- Interactive map of Coatetelco
- 18°43′36″N 99°19′44″W
- Periods: Late Preclassical Mesoamerican Period
- Cultures: Tlahuica and Nahuatl
- Location: Miacatlán, Morelos; Mexico

Coatetelco or Cuatetelco is a pre-Hispanic archaeological site located next to the Coatetelco Lagoon, two kilometers from Alpuyeca, in the Miacatlán municipality, Morelos, Mexico, near Xochicalco. It had its greatest development between 500 and 150 BCE.

== Name ==
Coatetelco means "place of snakes' mounds" or "place where there are erected mounds in honor of snakes". However, there are alternate spellings of the name that would carry a different meaning:

- Cuatetelco - Náhuatl language: cuahuitl = tree, branch, wood; tetelli = mound, bunch; cotl, co = place of. The whole means "mound place between trees" or "tree place on a mound".
- Cuahtetelco - coatl = snake; tetl = stone; co, cotl = place of. The whole means "place of the stone snake".
- Quahtetelco, the Tlahuica glyph, has a tree (Nahuatl: quahuitl) over a pyramid (Nahuatl: tetelli). As above, the word "co" is "place of ...". (Cuahtetelco Museum, Official Guide, Sep. 13, 1978. Pág. 5 p. 1-2).
- Cuauhtetelco.

== Background ==
At the end of the Pleistocene, the region was inhabited by people who lived in rocky shelters and had a diet based on hunting, gathering and fishing.

During the Early Formative or Preclassical period, people lived in small villages with less than 100 inhabitants and developed farm lands near the rivers. They produced ceramics similar to those of the Basin of Mexico and the first clay figurines were also made.

In the Mid-Preclassical period (900–500 BCE), villages were concentrated on the banks of the Chalma River, and the inhabitants practiced farming. The ceramics had strong local features, although there was some similarity to ceramics from the Basin of Mexico.

== History ==
Evidence from excavations show that there was human occupation at Coatetelco since the epoch of the Teotihuacan influence (450-600 BCE) even though the remaining structures are from the Late Postclassical (1350–1521), mainly in the Mexica epoch. Buildings had four construction stages.

The Coatetelco peak took place in the Late Preclassical period (500–150 BCE). At that time the communities had 250 to 500 inhabitants.

When Xochicalco declined around 1000 CE, Miacatlán became the leading center in the region. Subsequent history can be rebuilt based on written documents and codices.

== Site ==
Coatetelco was a medium-sized urban site. The central part of the city has been excavated and restored, including a ballgame court, a small pyramid-temple, and several other structures, clustered around a public square. There is a small site museum.

Coatetelco was excavated in the 1970s by archaeologist Raúl Arana, who supervised reconstruction of the architecture. Several minor excavations have been done since that time to keep the site in good condition. Ceramics from Arana’s excavations are described in a monograph. (Smith 2002, s.f.)

The architectural complex consists of pyramidal bases, platforms, and a ballgame court made with an earth core and covered with carved stones. Some sections still have walls and stairs with stucco remains. The structures are distributed around a square in accordance with the site's topography.

=== Western platform ===
The western platform, almost destroyed, had three structures with two stairways with side rafters. At the top of the structure are stucco floor remains and two stone "boxes". Beside the platform is a smaller platform with two steps. Stone cylinder artifacts were discovered here, but their purpose or use is not known.

=== Ballgame court ===
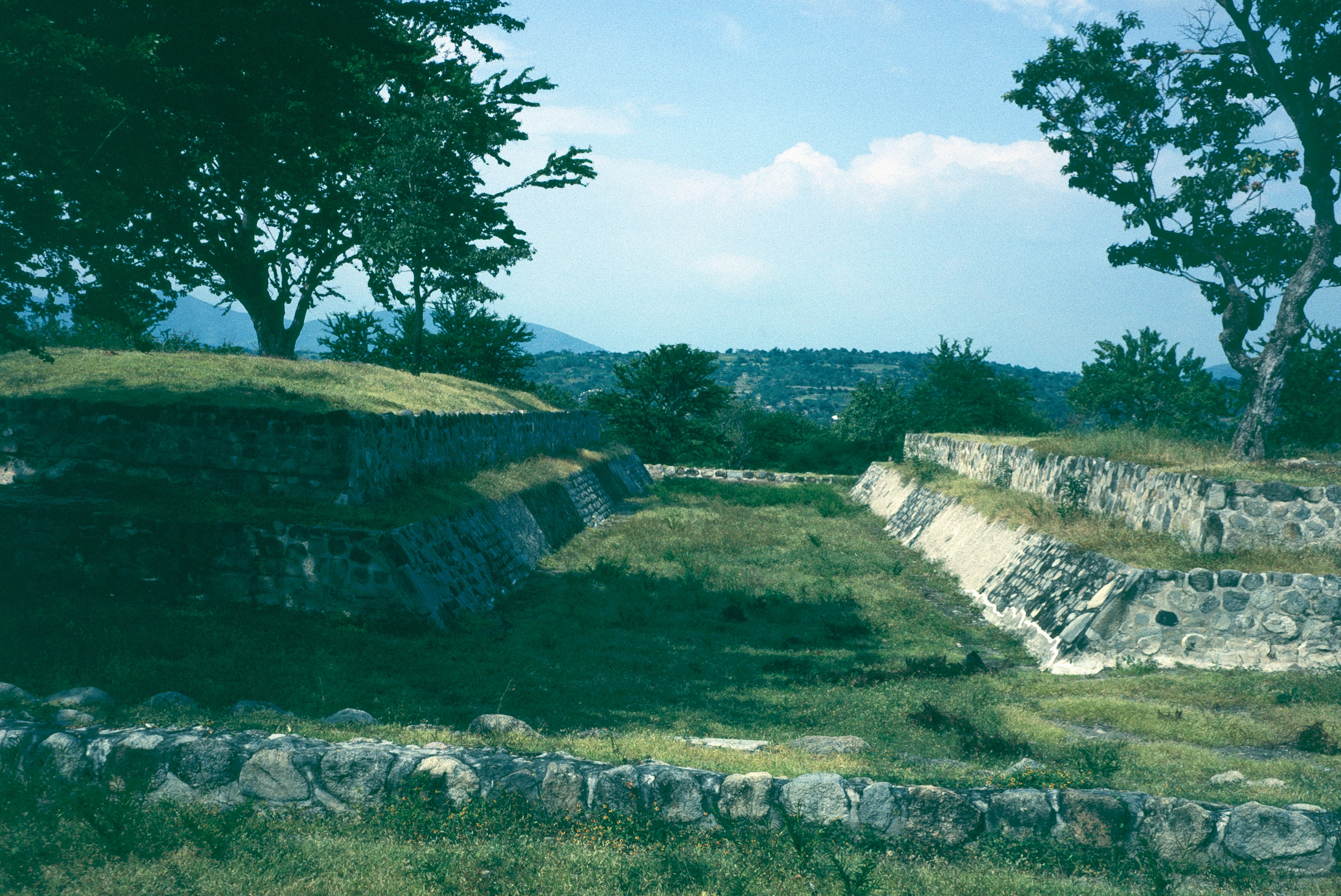
Ballgame court

The ballgame court is located behind the western platform. Its presence indicates that the place was a ceremonial center, since the ballgame had a religious purpose, as well as recreational and political purposes. Its header is closed: It is oriented north-south. The structure has traces of the stucco. Tzompantli remains were found and are associated with the court.

The ballgame court is relatively small for the game. Excavations under the main stairway of the platform found elite burials with hundreds of funeral offerings, including ceramic vessels, obsidian, jade, and copper-bronze artifacts. They also found a group of basaltic utensils for grinding corn on a metate, carefully arranged to the side of the ballgame court and visible today.

=== Extension platform ===
The extension platform is an extension of the ballgame court and the circular basement. It has a circular design and was likely dedicated to Ehécatl, the Wind God.

=== Eastern platform ===
The eastern platform has several semidetached buildings that possibly were altars. Its importance as a ceremonial site was confirmed with the finding of collective and individual burial places. Tombs and different kinds of offerings were found in the altar and stairs.

=== Incense altar ===
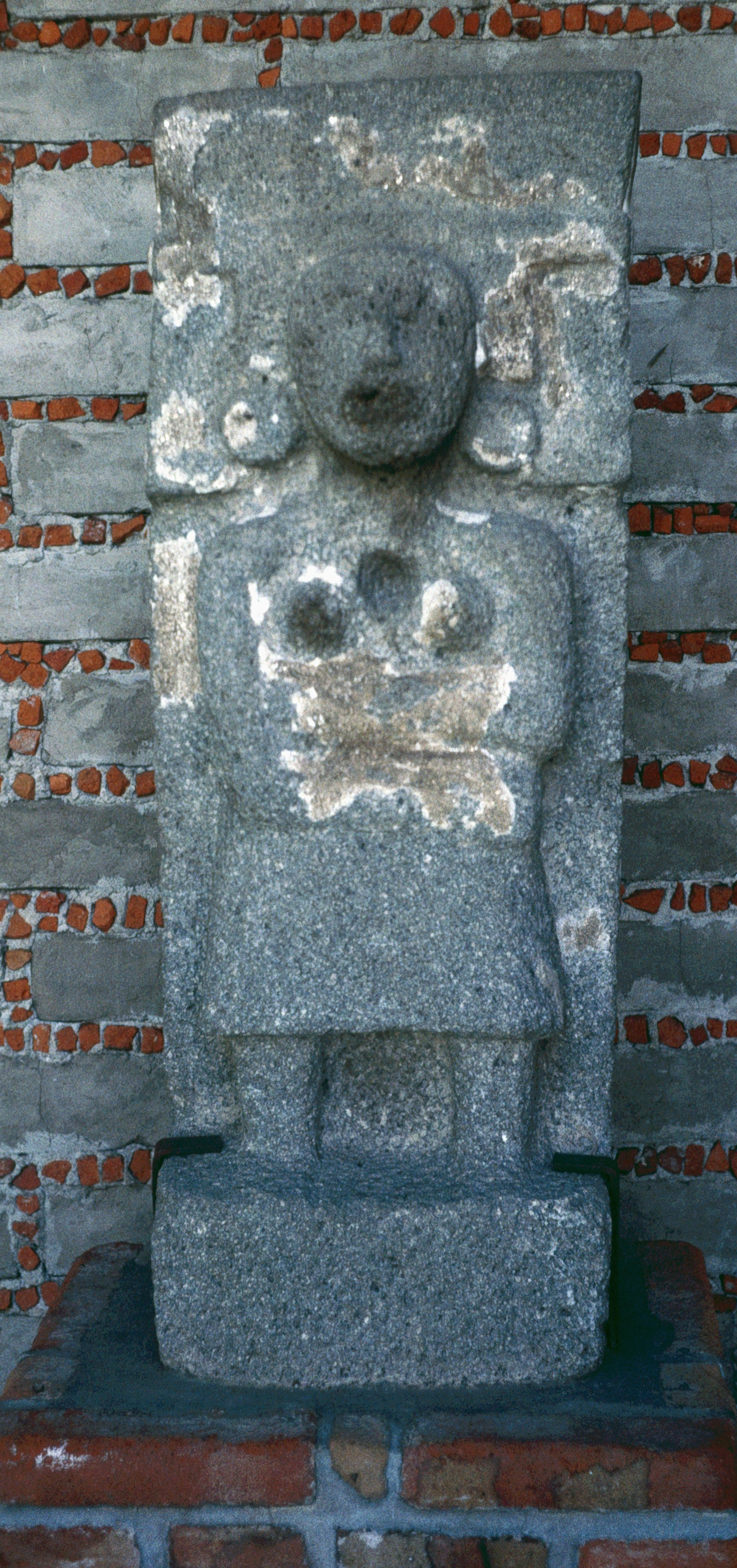
Feminine figure

The incense altar was identified by a stone sculpture representing a female character and some clay incense burners that were found during the excavations. The form of these is easily identified in the Mendocino Codex; they resemble big ladles with long handles.

=== Xipe-Totec platform ===
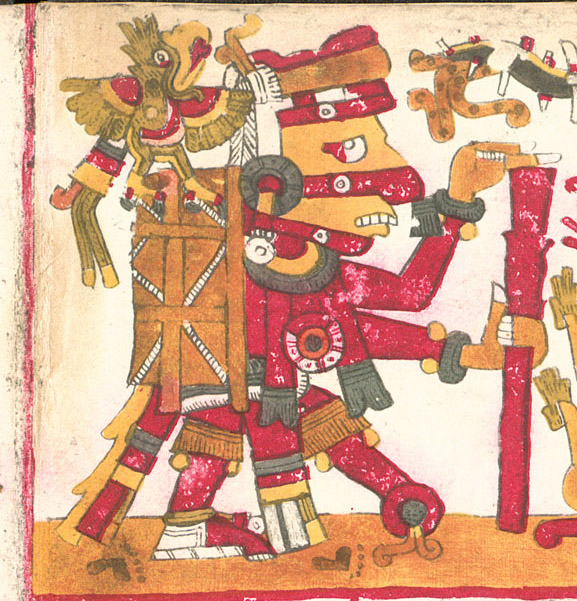
Xipe Totéc or Red Tezcatlipoca, Codex Borgia

The Xipe-Totec platform is the last portion of the semidetached basement. It was given this name because a Xipe-Totec stone sculpture was found in it. This is supported by the association with the circular altar and the presence of a stone called a temalacatl found in the rubble of a 16th-century chapel. This is a sacrificial stone that in the Mexica religion was related to the Xipe-Totec deity. The figure was fragmented (it lacked a head and feet). It is believed that the fracture was due to the Spanish practice of destroying artifacts from the cultures they found.

=== Cuauhtlitzin temple ===
The Cuauhtlitzin temple is called the main temple because it is the highest structure. A wide flight of stairs with lateral rafters leads to the top; vestiges of a temple are there. The pyramidal bodies of the basement are built in a slope and stuccoed. At the foot of the stairway is a badly damaged stele.

During the excavations a feminine stone sculpture identified as Cuauhtlitzin was found. The sculpture corresponds to a sculpted head that was hidden inside a carved stone vault.

== Climate ==
Climate data for Coatetelco
Month	Jan	Feb	Mar	Apr	May	Jun	Jul	Aug	Sep	Oct	Nov	Dec	Year
Mean daily maximum °C (°F)	29.9 (85.8)	32.6 (90.7)	34.6 (94.3)	36.6 (97.9)	36.8 (98.2)	33.3 (91.9)	32.6 (90.7)	32.5 (90.5)	32 (90)	32.0 (89.6)	32.0 (89.6)	30.8 (87.4)	33.0 (91.4)
Mean daily minimum °C (°F)	8.4 (47.1)	9.8 (49.6)	12.4 (54.3)	15.5 (59.9)	17.3 (63.1)	17.4 (63.3)	16.6 (61.9)	16.4 (61.5)	16.6 (61.9)	14.2 (57.6)	11.3 (52.3)	9.2 (48.6)	13.8 (56.8)
Average precipitation mm (inches)	2.5 (0.1)	0 (0)	2.5 (0.1)	5.1 (0.2)	38 (1.5)	180 (7.1)	230 (9.2)	160 (6.2)	170 (6.6)	69 (2.7)	5.1 (0.2)	0 (0)	860 (33.9)
Source: Weatherbase

== See also ==
- Coatetelco, Morelos, the modern municipality

== Bibliography ==
- Angulo Villaseñor, Jorge. 1978 Cuauhtetelco Museum: Official Guide. Instituto Nacional de Antropología e Historia, Mexico.
- Arana, Raúl. 1976 Coatetelco Investigation. Unpublished Report submitted to the Centro Regional Morelos, Instituto Nacional de Antropología e Historia.
- Smith, Michael E. n.d. Tlahuica Ceramics: The Aztec-Period Ceramics of Morelos, Mexico, Report.
- INAH 1992, Primera reimpresión, 1999 Consejo nacional para la Cultura y las Artes. Autora: Arqueóloga Bárbara Konieczna Z. Fotografía: Enrique Vela.
- Coatetelco, Pueblo de pescadores. Teódula Alemán Cleto Editorial, Qualy gráficos.
- El museo de Cuahtetelco, guía oficial, INAH-SEP México, 1978
- Religiosidad indígena, historia y etnografía, Coatetelco, Morelos Druzo Maldonado Jiménez INAH México, 2005
- Notas etnográficas: Coatetelco Irving Reynoso Jaime, Jesús Castro PACMyC México, 2002
