= Cuentepec =

Coordinates: 18°51′N 99°20′W

San Sebastian Cuentepec is a community in the municipality of Temixco in the state of Morelos, Mexico. The community is the only community in Morelos where Nahuatl is still spoken as the everyday language of the majority of the inhabitants.
