= Coatetelco, Morelos =

Municipality in Morelos, Mexico

Coordinates: 18°43′46″N 99°19′32″W

Coatetlco Quahtetelco
- Town and Municipality
- Location in Mexico
- Country: Mexico
- State: Morelos
- Established: 500 BC
- Municipality: January 9, 2019

Government
  - Type: Town
  - President: Norberto Zamorano Ortega

Area
  - Total: 980 km^{2} (380 sq mi)

Population
  - Total: 9,094
- Time zone: UTC-6 (Central Zone)
- Postal Code: 62606
- Area code: 737
- Website: https://www.encuentren.me/es/morelos/empresa/h-ayudanta-municipal-de-coatetelco/perfil/101197/

Coatetelco is an autonomous indigenous municipality created on January 1, 2019, in the Mexican state of Morelos. Located 980 meters (3,220 ft) above sea level, the municipality includes Lake Coatetelco and the Coatetelco archaeological site. It is one of the few indigenous fishing communities in central Mexico and has a population of 9,094.

The name Coatetelco comes from the Nahua language and means, "place of the serpents in the stone mounds." Quahtetelco (Coatetelco) was ruled by Xochicalco, and later by Cuauhnáhuac. When Cuauhnáhuac was conquered by the Aztecs in 1370, the commercially important Quahtetelco became a tributary area of Tenochtitlán.

Shortly after the Spanish conquest in the 16th century, Coatetelco became part of the Marquesado del Valle de Oaxaca, land was expropriated, and sugarcane planting began. When Mexico became independent in 1821, Coatetelco became part of the Third Military District of the State of Mexico and belonged to the municipality of Mazatepec starting 1823. In 1848 the hacienda of Miacatlan was to be incorporated into Mazatepec; the owners protested, and ten years later the municipality of Miacatlan was established, including Lake Coatetelco and the town of Coatetelco.

The state of Morelos was created in 1869, and Coatetelco became a part of the municipality of Miacatlán. Sugarcane production reached its peak during the Porfiriato, although the haciendas of Santa Cruz, Actopan, Cocoyotla, and Miacatlan were abandoned shortly after the outbreak of the Mexican Revolution of 1910. The hacienda of Acatzingo is in ruins today.

== History ==
Fossils of animals dating back 5,000 or 10,000 years BCE have been found in the area near Coatetelco. Coatetelco is one of the oldest human settlements in Morelos, since vestiges dating from 500 BC are found in its archaeological zone. It is believed that the first humans in the area were nomadic hunters. The Nahuas passed on the mythical pilgrimage from Aztlán through it.

Coatetelco was ruled by Xochicalco, and later by Cuauhnáhuac. When Cuauhnáhuac was conquered by the Aztecs in 1370, Quahtetelco (Coatetelco) became a tributary area of Tenochtitlán. Quahtetelco was commercially important, and its people were involved in fishing, agriculture, and hunting water birds.

Legend has it that when the Spanish arrived, they destroyed the temple of Cuaulitzin (also known as Tlanchana), and built the church of San Juan Bautista in its place. Shortly after the Spanish conquest in the 16th century, Coatetelco became part of the Marquesado del Valle de Oaxaca, land was expropriated, and sugarcane planting began. In 1701 the hacienda owners built a dam and established a trapiche (sugar mill). About the same time they established a cattle ranch called La Estancia (The Station).

When Mexico became independent in 1821, Coatetelco became part of the Third Military District of the State of Mexico and belonged to the municipality of Mazatepec starting 1823. In 1848 the hacienda of Miacatlan was to be incorporated into Mazatepec; the owners protested, and ten years later the municipality of Miacatlan was established, including Lake Coatetelco and the town of Coatetelco.

The state of Morelos was created in 1869, and Coatetelco became a part of the municipality of Miacatlán. Sugarcane production reached its peak during the Porfiriato, although the haciendas of Santa Cruz, Actopan, Cocoyotla, and Miacatlan were abandoned shortly after the outbreak of the Mexican Revolution of 1910. The hacienda of Acatzingo is in ruins today, and the land of the La Estancia ranch now belong to the local ejido.

Its 18th-century church of San Juan Bautista was used by the Zapatistas as a headquarters during the Mexican Revolution that began in 1910. The first school was established in 1926, and was destroyed in an earthquake in 1955; a two-story building replaced it in 1996. The first highway, linking Coatetelco to Alpuyeca and Mazatepec, was established in 1952. The town was electrified in the 1950s; the community health center was opened in 1959. The community policed itself until 1983. Ecotourism began in 2001.

On November 9, 2017, the Congress of Morelos approved the creation of four new municipalities in the state, including Coatetelco, effective January 1, 2019, although this was later reduced to three. The first challenge of the new municipality is the lack of economic resources. Eight months after its formation, the municipality is still struggling to resolve its differences with Miacatlan.

The state of Morelos reported 994 infections and 140 deaths from the COVID-19 pandemic in Mexico including six cases in Coatetelco on May 13, 2020. Schools and many businesses were closed throughout the state starting in mid-March. Coatetelco reported ten cases, five recuperations, and four deaths as of August 31. Thirteen cases were reported on December 27, 2020.

=== Myth ===
It is said that a group of Tlauhicas, during their pilgrimage from Aztlan, stopped to rest along the shore of Lake Coatetelco due to their priest being ill. He worsened, but before dying, he asked to be buried next to the lake. His stone tomb was carved with the figure of a snake with its mouth open, and it is believed that the name of the town comes from this glyph. The people became sedentary and productive, and they seldom married outside the community, thus preserving their roots and customs.

When the Spanish came, the glyph was hidden in the center of the lake, where it stayed for four hundred years. However, in 1985 the lake dried up, the stone became visible, and it was sold to a collector of pre-Hispanic art. Late one night, two helicopters flew overhead, as if to hunt ducks, and the stone mysteriously disappeared. (Teódula Alemán Cleto, in Coatetelco, Indigenous Fishing Town admits that no one knows how much of this, if any of it, is true).

== Culture ==
Coatetelco is one of the few indigenous fishing communities in central Mexico. Mojarra (bream), caught in the lake, is served fried, in soup, or in tamales and makes up the traditional diet, and there is a fish festival in November. Nearby Alpueca is known for its ice cream.

The municipality has its own chronicler, Teódula Alemán Cleto, "Mama Teo". She is a rural teacher and elder of Coatetelco who founded the Tlanchana Cultural Center in the 1990s. The center provides workshops for children and teenagers of the community. Mama Teo has also composed a corrido (ballad). video of "En El Muelle De Coatetelco" song

=== Dances ===
The Tukuanis is a group of dancers who hold dialogues in Nahuatl to represent hunting and trapping wild animals in traps. The dance of Los Moros represents a deadly battle between Christians and Moors. Los Vaqueritos (The Cowboys) is a colonial-era dance that demonstrates the lives of ranchers. Los Pastores (The Shepherds) only dance on Christmas Eve, and consist of one woman and several men. Las Pastoras are girls who dance on Candelaria and the feast of San Juan. Las Contradanzas are performed by girls who wear a large bow in their hair and form a human chain. Coatetelco also has its group of Chinelos, who probably represent the way the indigenous people saw the Spanish settlers. Xochipitzahua is a wedding dance similar to the Jarabe Tapatío, the so-called Mexican hat dance.

=== Holidays ===
The feast of la Virgin de la Candelaria is celebrated on the last Sunday of January. In Coatetelco, this feast remotes back to the pre-Hispanic fiesta of Teopixqui in honor of Princess Cuauhtlitzin, goddess of fertility.

Traditional medicine, such as cleanings with eggs and other rituals that serve to ward off evil spirits, undo hexes and attract good things, is frequently practiced in Coatetelco. Only 60% of the inhabitants are covered by the federal Social Security system.

Coatetelco is one of the few places in Morelos that still uses the huacapextle on the Day of the Dead, October 27—November 2. This is a woven table hung from the ceiling. It holds cempasúchil flowers, candles, 12 pieces of bread, 12 pieces of chocolate, 12 plates of green mole or tamales, two salt containers, water, and fruit. Twelve candles are also placed on the floor and the whole offering is purified with copal.

== Education ==
There are two indigenous schools, three preschools, four elementary schools (grades 1–6) and one middle school (grades 7–9) in Coatetelco.

The Feast of San Juan Bautista (St. John the Baptist) is celebrated on June 24, with dances of the Moors and the Tecuanes, as well as bullfights. The feast of San Miguel (St. Michael the Archangel) is celebrated on September 29 with visits to the fields, and the Day of the Dead on November 2 features the hanging of offerings.

== Churches and religion ==
The traditional pre-Hispanic religion was based on respect and faith in Mother Nature. Faithful to its roots, the traditional Huentle a los airecitos are celebrated on June 23 and at the cultural fair on the last Saturday and Sunday of November. The "Airecitos" are pre-Hispanic gods who predict rain, detect illnesses, and cure the sick. They live in caves, gulches, lakes, and other natural areas. The June festival is to pray for a good crop, while the November festival is to give thanksgiving for it. Due to the large number of young men who have emigrated to the United States in search of better lives, the November festival is kept alive primarily due to the efforts of the Centro Cultural Tlanchana.

The Christian Evangelization of Coatetelco dates to about 1529 or 1530. In 1531, under the leadership of Fray Toribio de Benavente Motolinia, construction of a house which included two rooms and an atrium was begun on where a temple had stood near the lake. A cross was found there between 1974 and 1978 when the floor was changed during remodeling. In 1590 two cells, a vicarage, and a portico were built, and construction began on an open chapel. Construction stopped in the 17th century when Xuan Xuarez led an armed rebellion against the landowners due to land expropriation. The monks defended the landowners, and the peasants destroyed the vicarage, which was seen as the center of Spanish control. The Marquis later destroyed the entire complex. Construction of the church of San Juan Bautista was completed in Baroque style in the 18th century, although a large convent was never built. Since that time, the original design of the building has been lost, largely because the Zapatistas used it as a headquarters during the Mexican Revolution that began in 1910. Its restoration was begun in 1926. Then as a result of the 1985 Mexico City earthquake, the building was again damaged. The church was severely damaged in the September 19, 2017 earthquake, which also cost five lives in Coatetelco.

There is also the Catholic chapels of Candelaria (Narvarte), the chapel of San Jose (Benito Juarez), a Seventh Day Adventist church downtown, the Iafcj Casa De Dios Pentecostes Eben Ezer, Centro Christiano Misiones Transmundiales (both downtown), Iglesia Betel (Benito Juarez), Iglesia Cristiana Evangelica (Benito Juarez), and Salon del Reyno de los Testigos de Jehova (Narvarte).

== Geography ==
Coatetelco is located in western Morelos, 34 km (21 mi) from Cuernavaca and 126 km (78 mi) from Mexico City. It has a perimeter of about 24 km and is located at 18°43'45"N and 99°19'30"W. To the north is Miacatlan, Lake El Rodeo, the Xochicalco archaeological zone, and the town of Tetlama. To the south are Ahuehuetzingo and Puente de Ixtla. Alpuyeca and Xoxocotla are to the east, and Mazatepec and Tetecala are to the west.

The highest elevations in Coatetelco are the Cerro de Tepansillo, located north of town and the Cerro Pie de Moctezuma northeast of the lake. It is said that the lava-covered hill of Tepansillo once had a 50 centimeters (20 in) hole where air blew out; hence the name (Whistling Hill). The hill is located in Colonia Saavadra and provides a lookout point. Every May people in the town take flowers to hill in honor of the Virgen de la Purisima, and there is a June 23 mass in honor of San Juan. There is a limestone mine on the hill's east side. There is a large stone with a carved footprint on the side of the other hill, said to be in honor of Mexica king Motecuhzoma Xocoyotzin to celebrate his victory over Quauheteleco. The stone was partially destroyed during the construction of the Coatetelco-Miacatlan road in 1976.

=== Neighborhoods ===
Colonia Benito Juárez Garcia was founded in 1954 on lands that previously belonged to the field known as La Nopalera. It has a fair on March 21 in honor of the former president.

Colonia Saavadra is located at the summit of the Cerro de Tepansillo. It was founded in the 1960s, and the town cemetery is located there.

Colonia Navarete was founded west of town in the fields of Piedra Grande in the 1970s. It has a chapel dedicated to the Virgen de la Candelaria.

Colonia El Muelle gets its name from the boat dock located there. It was founded in 1976 on lands formerly called La Guamuchillera where corn, beans, and squash were once grown.

Colonia Cruzero de Xochicalco near Lake El Rodeo is near the federal highway Alpuyeca—Grutas that goes to the Xochicalco archaeological site. It was founded in 1977 and has a small health center.

Colonia 3 de Mayo is located on a small hill called El Capiro (named for a plant with purple berries used to make atole) and was founded in the 1980s.

Colonia San Isidro Labrador was founded in 2007 along the Alpuyeca—Coatetelco highway. Colonia El Charco was also founded in 2007. The Cuauhtémoc athletic field is located in the neighborhood.

=== Lake Coatetelco and climate ===
Lake Coatetelco is a natural lake with eight wells for irrigation and nine for human consumption. Fish include the mojarra carpa de Israel (bream) and lobina (bass). The average temperature is 22 °C (72 °F), the rainy season is from July to October, and prevailing winds come from the north.

According to legend, Lake Coatetelco was formed by Princess Cuauhtlitzin when the region was attacked by enemy tribes. When she implored the gods for help, and they sent lightning rto kill the enemy and rain to flood the fields so they could not be stolen. She survived, but when she saw how her people had drowned, she cried bitterly and threw a garland of flowers on the water, causing her to be buried there. Thus the lake was created. The survivors supposedly carved the sculpture of Cuauhtlitzin that is found in the local museum, and she is honored during the fiestas of Teopixqui in June and November. Cuauhtlitzin is called La Tlanchana (Mermaid or girlfriend of the fishermen), and it is believed that if she leaves, the lake will dry up. This supposedly happened in the 19th century when she left Coatetelco and went to Lake Tequesquitengo because the workers on the haciendas suffered so much. The lake also dried up in 1985.

== Places and events of interest ==
The Coatetelco archaeological site just outside town is the principal attraction. Built by Tlauhuicas in the post-classical period after Xochicalco, Coatetelco has a large plaza where sacrifices were made to the god of the wind, Ehécatl; a ball ground; and a museum.

The Cultural, Artisanal, and Gastronomic Fish Festival takes place in November. This is a traditional indigenous festival including prayers to Mother Earth for good weather.

There are several restaurants around Lake Coateteleco which offer freshwater mojarra. One can also fish or kayak in the lake, and mountain biking and horseback riding are available.

== See also ==
- List of people from Morelos
- Miacatlan
- See Jojutla for information on Lake Tequesquitengo.
