= José Amado Orihuela Trejo =

Mexican politician

- Born: 5 January 1954 (age 72); Morelos, Mexico
- Occupation: Politician
- Political party: PRI

José Amado Orihuela Trejo (born 5 January 1954) is a Mexican politician affiliated with the Institutional Revolutionary Party (PRI). In 2006–2009 he served as a federal deputy in the 60th Congress, representing the fourth district of Morelos.
