= Rosalina Mazari =

Mexican politician

- Born: 7 November 1971 (age 54); Cuernavaca, Morelos, Mexico
- Occupation: Politician
- Political party: PRI

Rosalina Mazari Espín (born 7 November 1971) is a Mexican politician affiliated with the Institutional Revolutionary Party (PRI).

She has been elected to the Chamber of Deputies to represent the fourth district of Morelos on three occasions: in 2003, for the 59th Congress; in 2009, for the 61st Congress; and in 2015, for the 63rd Congress.
