= Mazatepec =

City in Morelos, Mexico

Coordinates: 18°43′37″N 99°21′43″W

- Municipality
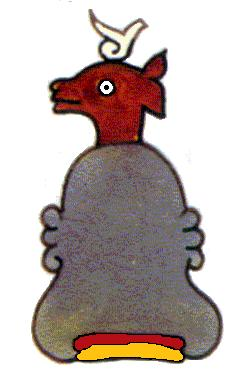
- Coat of arms

- Location in Mexico Mazatepec (Mexico)
- Country: Mexico
- State: Morelos
- Demonym: (in Spanish)
- Time zone: UTC−6 (CST)

Mazatepec is a city in the Mexican state of Morelos.

The city serves as the municipal seat for the surrounding municipality of the same name. The name Mazatepec means hill of deer. To the north and northeast is Miacatlán, to the northwest is Coatlán del Río, to the south is Amacuzac, to the east is Puente de Ixtla, and to the west is Tetecala.

The municipality reported 9,967 inhabitants in the 2015 census.

== History ==
Mazatepec is a town located in Morelos. The name Mazatepec comes from the Nahuatl mazatl "deer", and tepetl "hill". Mazatepec became part of the political and religious cultural center of Xochicalco, which was occupied since the Preclassic (1500-1000 BC) but its greatest development and boom occurred in the Classic, between AD 300 and 900. In the year AD 603, a group of Toltecs settled there. Later, Mazatepec came under the power of the manor of Cuauhnahuac (Cuernavaca), which in turn was a tributary of the Aztecs. During the colonial era, Mazatepec was integrated into the jurisdiction of Cuernavaca, belonged to the Marquisate of the Valley of Oaxaca with the name of San Lucas Mazatepec. On this site Hernán Cortés established the first cattle ranch in Mexico. After Independence (1821), when the State of Mexico was created, Mazatepec was a municipality that belonged to the District of Tetecala, conserving this category when the State of Morelos was created (1869). In prehispanic times Mazatepec was part of a religious and political center under the reign of Xochicalco.

The state of Morelos reported 209 cases and 28 deaths due to the COVID-19 pandemic in Mexico, as of April 27, 2020; two cases were reported in Mazatepec. Schools and many businesses were closed from mid March until June 1. On June 2, Mazatepec reported five confirmed cases and one death from the virus; the reopening of the state was pushed back until at least June 13. Mazatepec reported 16 cases, 13 recuperations, and three deaths from the virus as of August 31. Nineteen cases were reported on December 27, 2020.

== Culture ==
=== Attractions and festivals ===
La Loma (the hill) provides a panoramic view of the town of Mazatepec, including the Laguna de Coatetelco (Lake Coatetelco). There is a fair in La Loma on the 5th Friday of Lent. There are brass bands, locally produced ice cream, fireworks, and mechanical rides.

The Parish of St. Luke in Mazatepec dates from 1696 and was built by the order of the Franciscans. His feast is celebrated October 17–24.

The Sanctuary of the Lord of Calvary is built on prehispanic ruins. In the zócalo (town square) of Mazatepec there is a bronze monument called "El Origen" in honor of the name of Mazatepec, which in the Nahuatl language means "In the Cerro del Venado".

The bullring "San Lucas" and the "Unidad Deportiva de Mazatepec" (athletic complex) are both located in the municipal seat. There is a week-long celebration in honor of Emiliano Zapata in the bullring during the month of August.

Cuauchichinola is home to a rustic waterpark called, Los Ojitos de Agua ("little eyes of water"). There is a fair in honor of St. Mark on April 25. You can also swim in the Chalma River on the edge of town.

Santa Cruz is home to Ex-hacienda de Santa Cruz Vista Alegre which has hosted movies, soap operas, and commercials.

== Notable people ==
- General Vicente Aranda was born in the hacienda of Cuauchichinola and joined the Zapatista forces in March 1911 under the orders of General Lorenzo Vásquez. He participated in the capture and looting of Jojutla and Tlaquiltenango, on March 18, 1911. Aranda was dismissed after the massacre but rejoined Zapata after the proclamation of the Plan de Ayala. Vicente Aranda remained in the liberating army of the south until 1920, when the Revolutionary Unification took place. In 1921 he was elected Federal Deputy for the first district of the State of Morelos. Later he was municipal president of Jojutla and died there on July 22, 1926. There is a town named for him in the municipality of Jojutla.
- General Julián González Guadarrama was born in the town of Mazatepec on November 30, 1890. He joined the Mexican Revolution in Chontalcoatlán in March 1911 under the command of General Joaquín Miranda of the forces of General Ambrosio Figueroa. Later he fought in Iguala, Guerrero, where he was crippled and returned to his hometown. He rejoined the Zapatista forces under the orders of Colonel Silvino Pérez Benítez. He participated in the battles of Zacatepec and the Siege of Cuernavaca. Gonzalez Vasquez participated in the organization of the first league of the agrarian communities of which he was Senior Officer until March 1935; later he was president of the State Committee of the National Revolutionary Party. He was a Federal Deputy to the XLI Legislature. Julián González died in Cuernavaca after dedicating himself to agriculture there.
- Maxima Trinidad Perez Coria of PRI (Institutional Revolutionary Party) was elected Presidente Municipal (mayor) in the election of July 1, 2018.

== See also ==
- List of people from Morelos
