= Xochicalco =

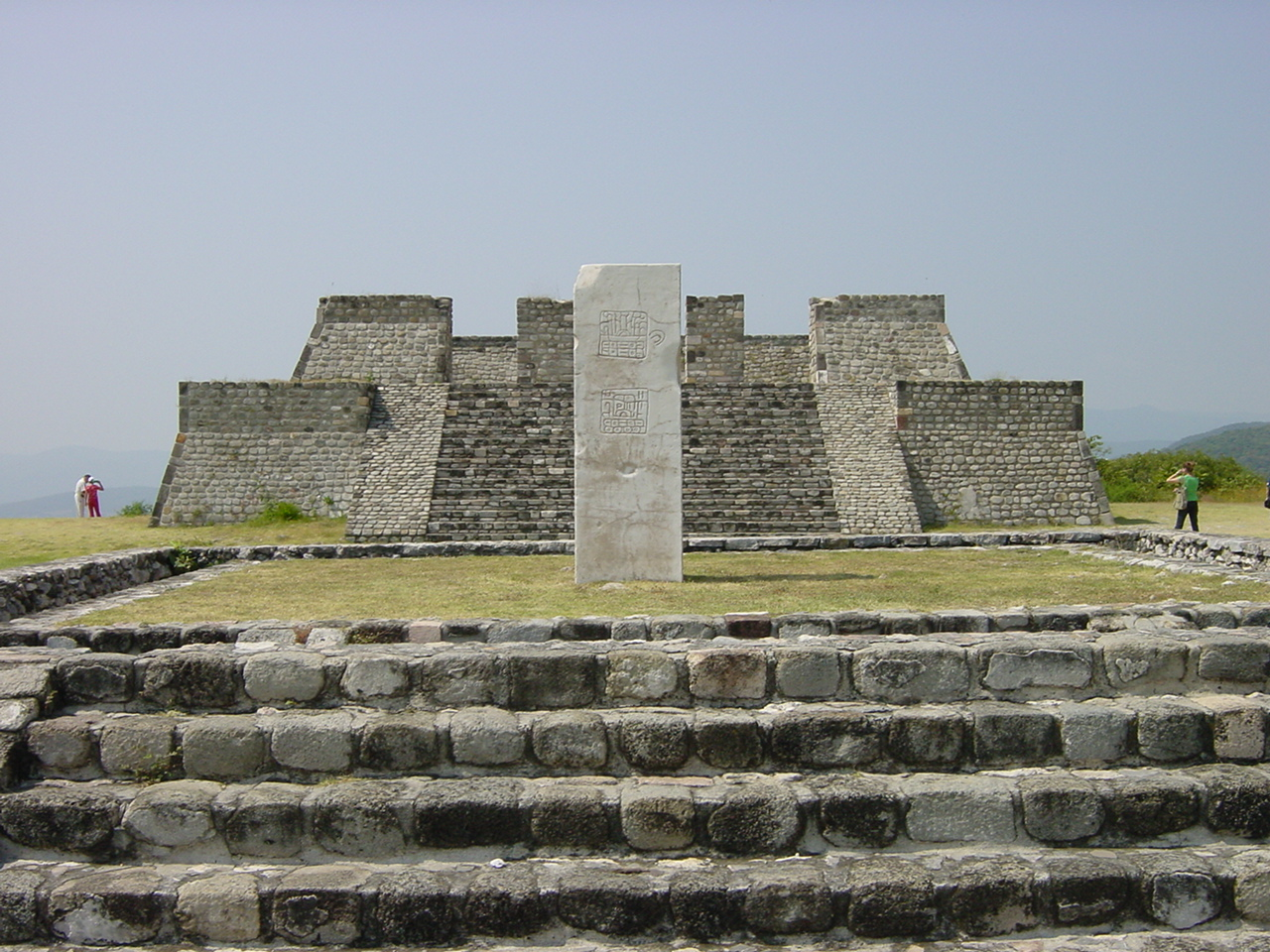
- Pyramids in Xochicalco

- Location within Mesoamerica
- 18°48′14″N 99°17′45.3″W
- Periods: Late Classic
- Location: Miacatlán, Morelos, Mexico
- Region: Mesoamerica

UNESCO World Heritage Site
- Official name: Archaeological Monuments Zone of Xochicalco
- Criteria: Cultural: iii, iv
- Reference: 939
- Inscription: 1999 (23rd Session)
- Area: 707.65 ha (1,748.6 acres)

Xochicalco (Nahuatl pronunciation: [ʃot͡ʃiˈkaɬko]) is a pre-Columbian archaeological site in Miacatlán in the western part of the Mexican state of Morelos. The name Xochicalco may be translated from Nahuatl as "in the house of Flowers". The site is located 38 km southwest of Cuernavaca, about 122 km by road from Mexico City. The site is open to visitors all week, from 10 am to 5 pm, although access to the observatory is only allowed after noon. The apogee of Xochicalco came after the fall of Teotihuacan and it has been speculated that Xochicalco may have played a part in the fall of the Teotihuacan empire.

The architecture and iconography of Xochicalco show affinities with Teotihuacan, the Maya area, and the Matlatzinca culture of the Toluca Valley. Today the residents of the nearby village of Cuentepec speak Nahuatl.

The main ceremonial center is atop an artificially leveled hill, with remains of residential structures, mostly unexcavated, on long terraces covering the slopes. The site was first occupied by 200 BC, but did not develop into an urban center until the Epiclassic period (AD 700 – 900). Nearly all the standing architecture at the site was built at this time. At its peak, the city may have had a population of up to 20,000 people.

Xochicalco is an UNESCO World Heritage Site and a tourist destination. The site also has a well-stocked museum.

== Monuments ==
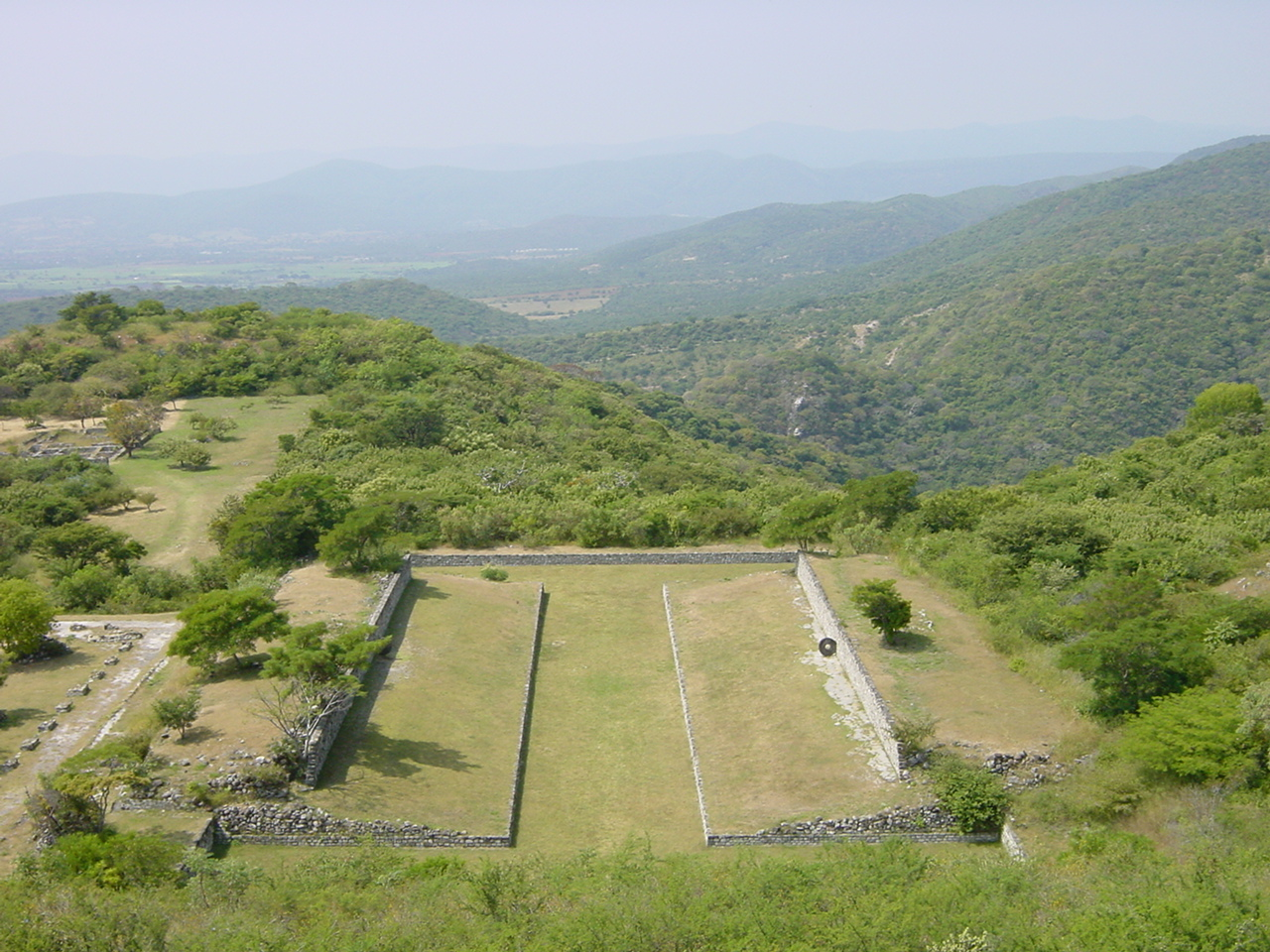
The primary ballcourt at Xochicalco.

Of special interest are sculptured reliefs on the sides of some buildings. The Temple of the Feathered Serpent has fine stylized depictions of that deity in a style which includes apparent influences of Teotihuacan and Maya art. The high taluds of the pyramid bear relief carvings that depict towns that paid tribute to Xochicalco as well as several seated figures that look Mayan. It has been speculated that Xochicalco may have had a community of artists from other parts of Mesoamerica.

Other monuments at the site include several other step-pyramid temples, palaces, three ballcourts, sweat-baths, an unusual row of circular altars, and a cave with steps carved down into it. The site also has some free-standing sculptured stelae; others were removed from their original location and are now on display in the INAH museum in Mexico City and at the site museum.

== History and Exploration ==
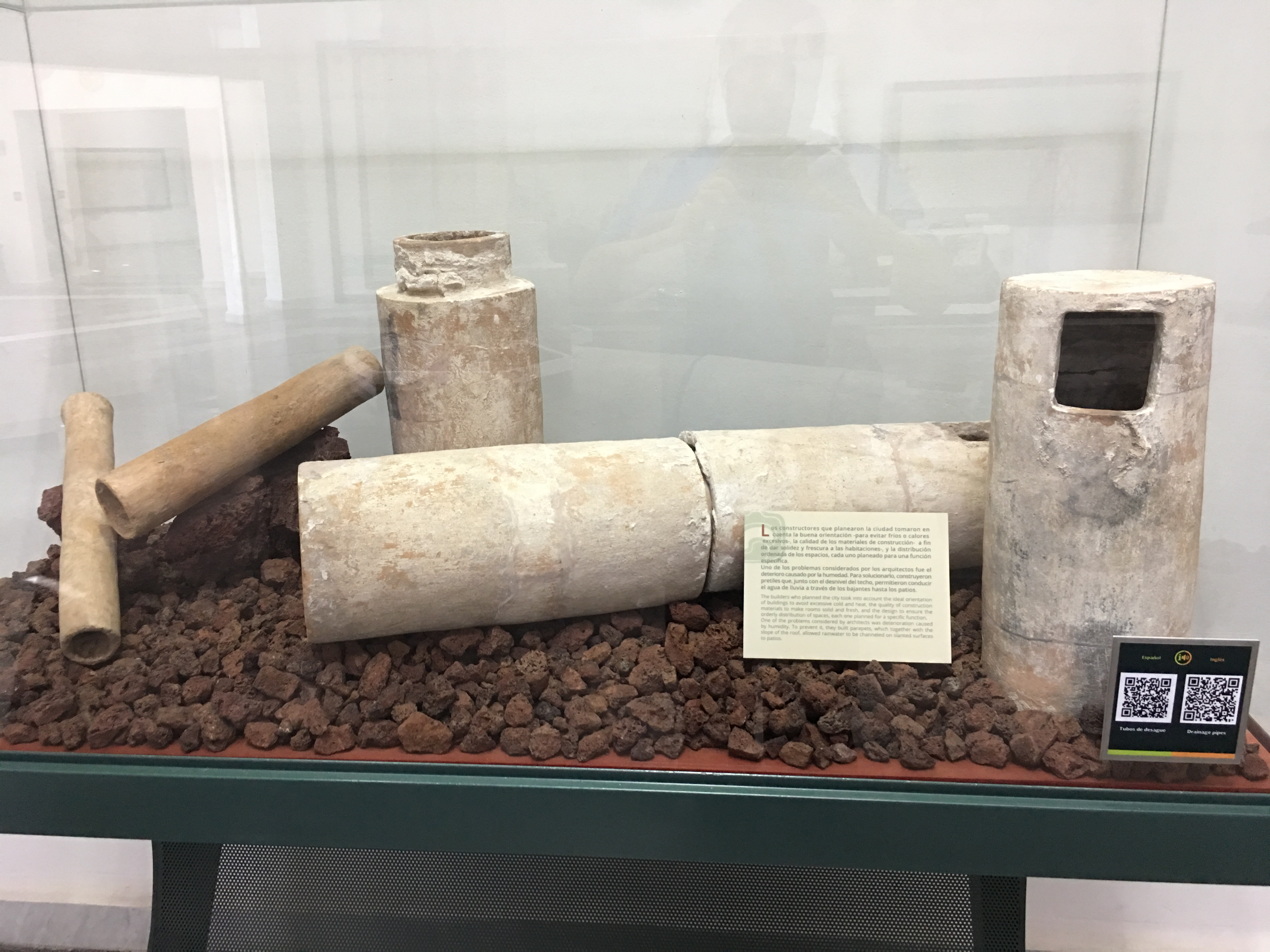
Rain drainage pipes from Xochicalco

Xochicalco was founded in about 650 AD by the Olmeca-Xicallanca, who were a group of Maya traders from Campeche, at a site that gave them an excellent position along several of the major Mesoamerican trade routes. The city-state had a population of 10,000 to 15,000 people, many of whom were engaged in craft production and long-distance trade. It was an important fortressed commercial and religious center following the decline of the great Meso-American city states. The poor farming conditions in the area show that it was likely built for defense purposes and trading. The ruins were first described by explorer Antonio Alzate in 1777. In 1810, Alexander von Humboldt published a description and illustration of Xochicalco, based on Alzate's description and an engraving published in Mexico City in 1791. Emperor Maximilian of Mexico visited the ruins. The Temple of the Feathered Serpent was restored by Mexican archaeologist Leopoldo Batres in 1910. Major archaeological excavations and further restorations were done in a project from the 1940s through the 1960s by Eduardo Noguera and César Saenz. Jaime Litvak King also worked at the site. In 1976 archaeologist Kenneth Hirth of Pennsylvania State University began a multi-season fieldwork project in which he mapped the entire site and conducted excavations of houses and obsidian workshops. In 1988 a large-scale program of excavation of monumental architecture was initiated by Norberto González Crespo and Silvia Garza of the INAH. A new museum was built to house the spectacular finds of this project.

A 2009 concession granted to Canadian mining company Esperanza Silver threatens the site, according to archaeologist Silvia Garza Tarazona of the Centro del Instituto Nacional de Antropología e Historia (INAH) Morelos.

== Destruction of the city ==
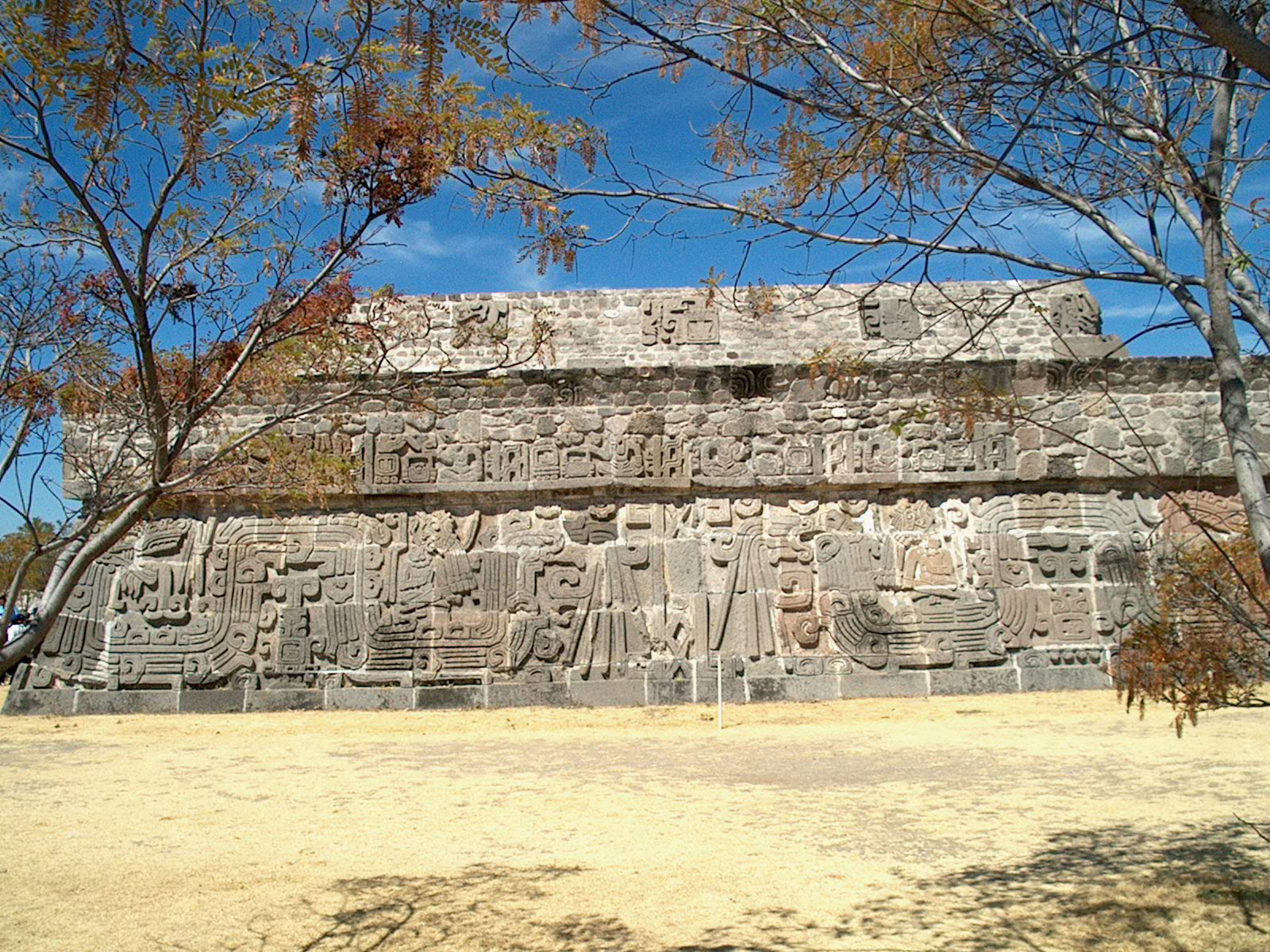
Temple of the Feathered Serpent

At some point around 900 CE the city of Xochicalco was burned and destroyed. Many of the excavated houses and temples have layers of burning and destruction that cover the deposits from the main Epiclassic occupation. Underneath destruction layers, numerous objects were left in place in the houses, indicating that the site was destroyed and abandoned quickly. A small remnant population lived on, however, on the lower slopes of the hill. Later, around 1200, the site was recolonized by the Nahuatl-speaking Tlahuica peoples, ancestors to the Nahuatl-speaking populations of the modern state of Morelos.

== Astronomical observatory ==
The observatory is a cave modified to allow study of the movement of the sun. The cave was covered with stucco and painted black, yellow and red with a chimney that measured from the base to the surface 8.7 meters, and which is hexagonal in the top. The chimney has a slight slope allowing the sun's rays to be to projected on the floor of the cave.

In the 105 days running from 30 April to 15 August, the sun shines into the cave. In the sun's movement towards the Tropic of Cancer and upon their return, respectively, on 14/15 May and 28/29 July, the sun is at its zenith and the astronomical noon, the beam of light falls directly through the chimney showing the image of the sun on the floor of the cave. Surely, taking advantage of the solar phenomenon, the site was also used for religious ceremonies.

== Temple of the Feathered Serpent ==
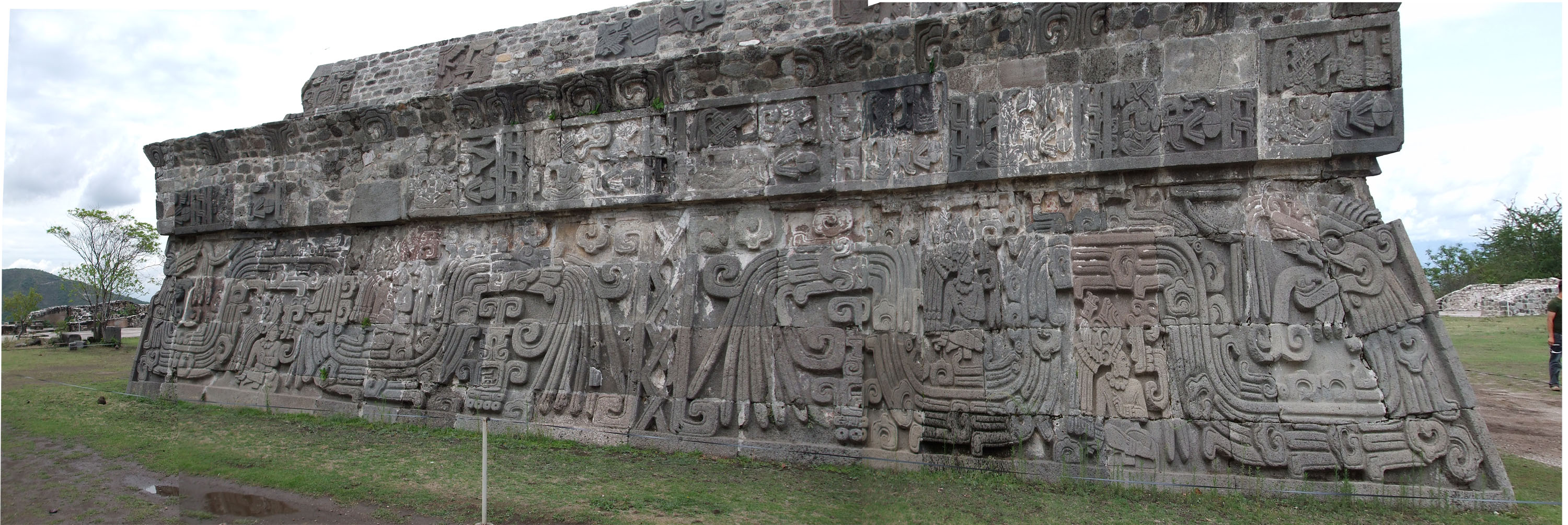
Temple of the Feathered Serpent

The Temple of the Feathered Serpent has fine stylized depictions of that deity in a style which includes apparent influences of Teotihuacan and Maya art.

== See also ==
- List of archaeoastronomical sites sorted by country
- List of Mesoamerican pyramids

== Major publications ==
- De la Fuente, Beatriz, Silvia Garza Tarazona, Norberto González Crespo, Arnold Leboef, Miguel León Portilla and Javier Wimer (1995) La Acrópolis de Xochicalco, Instituto de Cultura de Morelos, Cuernavaca.
- González Crespo, Norberto; Garza Tarazona, Silvia; de Vega Nova, Hortensia; Mayer Guala, Pablo; Canto Aguilar, Giselle (Fall 1995). "Archaeological Investigations at Xochicalco, Morelos: 1984 and 1986". Ancient Mesoamerica. 6 (2): 223–236. doi:10.1017/S0956536100002200. JSTOR 26307315.
- Hirth, Kenneth G. (editor) (2000) Archaeological Research at Xochicalco, Volume 1, Ancient Urbanism at Xochicalco: The Evolution and Organization of a Pre-Hispanic Society., and Volume 2, The Xochicalco Mapping Project. University of Utah Press, Salt Lake City.
- Hirth, Kenneth G. (editor) (2006) Obsidian Craft Production in Ancient Central Mexico, University of Utah Press, Salt Lake City.
- Hirth, Kenneth G. and Ann Cyphers Guillén (1988) Tiempo y asentamiento en Xochicalco. Instituto de Investigaciones Antropológicas, Universidad Nacional Autónoma de México, Mexico City.
