= Miacatlán =

Miacatlan Miacatlán
- City
- Miacatlán
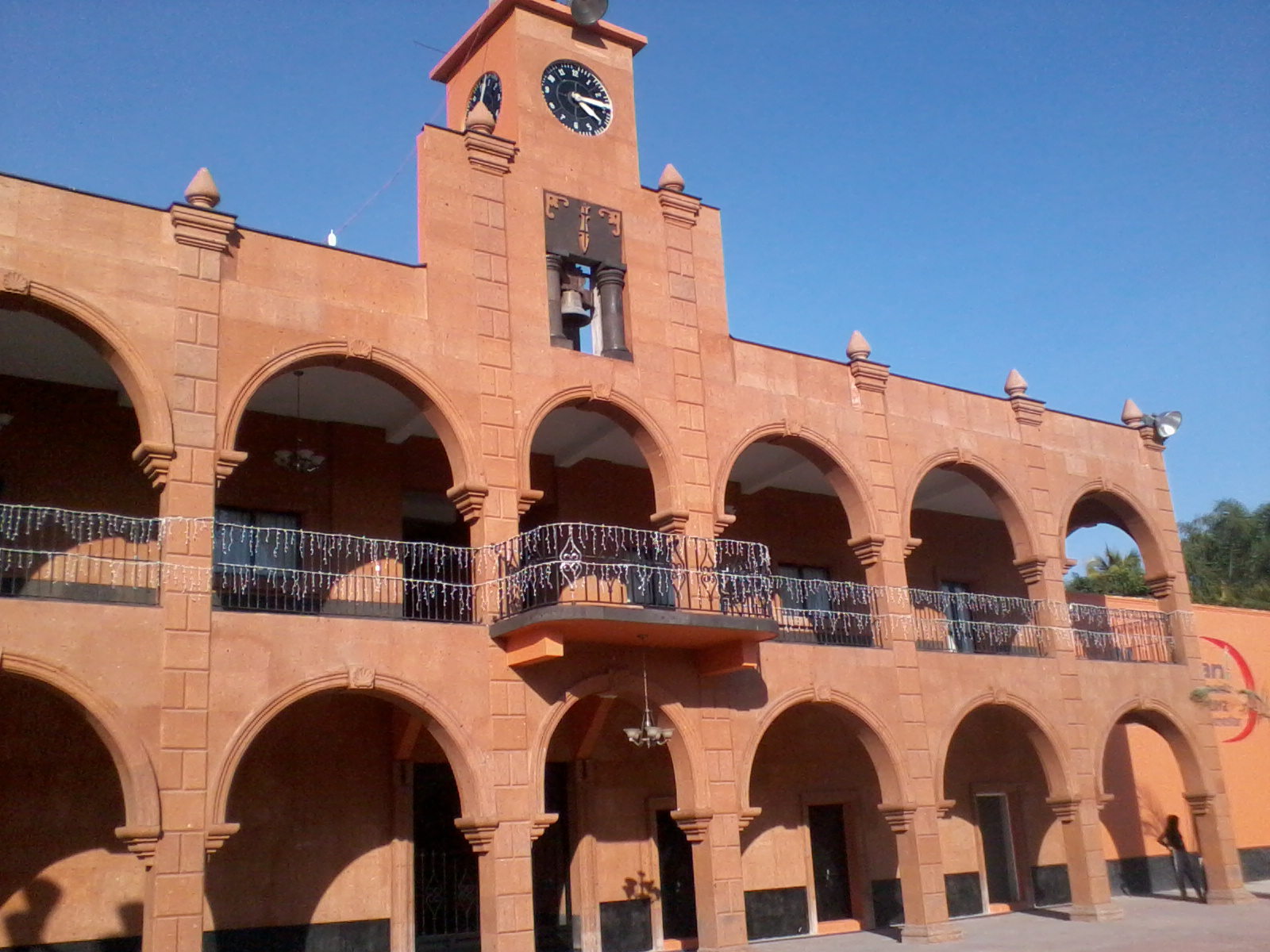
- Municipal Palace of Miacatlan

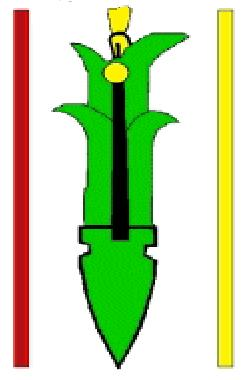
- Coat of arms
- Interactive map of Miacatlan
- Coordinates: 18°46′20″N 99°21′17″W
- Country: Mexico
- State: Morelos
- Founded: 1869

Government
  - Mayor: Abel Espín Garcia

Population (2015)
  - Total: 26,713

Miacatlán is a city and municipal seat of the municipality of Miacatlán in the Mexican state of Morelos. It stands at 18°46′20″N 99°21′17″W.

To the north is the State of Mexico and the municipality of Temixco, to the south Puente de Ixtla, Mazatepec and Tetecala, to the east Xochitepec, and to the west Coatlán del Río and the State of Mexico. The city serves as the municipal seat for the surrounding municipality of the same name. The municipality reported 26,713 inhabitants in the 2015 census. The altitude of Miacatlan is 1,054 meters above sea level and it covers 233,644.30 km^{2} of territory, and it is 40 km from Cuernavaca.

The toponym Miacatlán comes from a Nahuatl name Mitl (arrow), and Acatl (rod or cane), and Tlan (place), and means "place of abundant reeds for arrows". This is probably in reference to the two lakes in the municipality, Coatetelco and El Rodeo.

The archaeological site of Coatetelco is also in Miacatlan.

== History ==
The history of the municipality of Miacatlán goes back to the pre-Hispanic era, it was part of a political and religious center, tributary to Xochicalco, but later it belonged to the Cuauháhuac manor. Miacatlán was conquered by the Aztecs, which made it belong to Tenochtitlán. During the colonial period, it was called San Francisco Miacatlán and became part of the Marquesado del Valle de Oaxaca.

In 1823 Miacatlan was part of the municipality of Mazatepec, State of Mexico. When Morelos became a state in 1869, Miacatlán acquired the category of municipality, including the towns of Coatetelco and Palpan de Barandas, the ranches of Nexapa and Ojo de Agua, as well as the Haciendas of Acatzingo, La Nigua, and Miacatlán.

During the Mexican Revolution, General Pedro Ojeda fled to the Hacienda de Miacatlán after the Siege of Cuernavaca (1914). Also General Francisco V. Pacheco was shot on orders of General Emiliano Zapata at El Zapote in 1917.

Abel Espin Garcia of Juntos por Morelos (Together for Morelos coalition) was elected Presidente Municipal (mayor) in the election of July 1, 2018.

The community of Coatetelco became a separate municipality on January 1, 2019.

As of May 4, 2020, there were 505 infections and 59 deaths in the state of Morelos and four confirmed infections from the COVID-19 pandemic in Miacatlan. Schools and many businesses were closed from mid March until June 1. On June 2, Miacatlán reported 14 confirmed cases and two deaths from the virus; the reopening of the state was pushed back until at least June 13. Miacatlán reported 24 cases, 18 recuperations, and four deaths from the virus as of August 31. Thirty-seven cases were reported on December 27, 2020.

== Communities ==
- Miacatlan is the municipal seat. The town has 7,212 inhabitants and is located at 1,005 meters (3,927 ft.) above sea level. There are three preschools (two public, one private), five elementary schools (four public, one private), two middle schools (one public, one private), and two high schools, grades 10-12 (one public, one private). It is located 44 km south of Cuernavaca and 132 km from Mexico City.
- El Mirador has 1,392 inhabitants. It is located at 1,053 meters (3,455 ft.) above sea level. It is one km from the municipal seat.
- Xochicalco (Cirenio Longares) has 1,361 inhabitants. It is located next to El Rodeo at 1,170 meters (3,839 ft.) above sea level. is an agricultural community; many of its other residents work in Cuernavaca. The archaeological site of the same name is located near the community. There is one Indigenous school, one preschool, one elementary school, and one middle school. It is located 8 km from the municipal seat.
- El Rodeo has 1,278 inhabitants. It is located next to Xochicaclo at 1,096 meters (3,596 ft.) above sea level. There are two preschools (one public, one private), one elementary school (grades 1-6), and one middle school (grades 7-9). El Rodeo is an agricultural community; many of its other residents work in Cuernavaca. The lake by the same name was formed by damming the Rio Tenembe. It is 5 km from the municipal seat.
- Palpan de Baranda has more than 1,000 inhabitants. It is a farming and ranching community located 20 km from the municipal seat of Miacatlan. It is located at 1,611 meters (5,285 ft.) above sea level. There is one preschool, one elementary school, and one middle school.
- Other communities are very small. Tlajotla is considered the most beautiful town in the municipality. It has 148 inhabitants and is located at 1,641 meters (5,384 ft.) above sea level. There is one preschool, one elementary school, and one middle school. It is 23 km from the municipal seat.

== Points of interest ==
- Parish church of Santo Tomas Apóstol is yellow outside and white inside. There is a fair on December 21.
- Chapel of the Alma de la Virgen, located next to the Parish of Santo Tomas. There is a festival on February 11.
- Parish of San Juan Bautista in Coatepec.
- Parish of the Purísima Concepción in Palpan. The Ash Wednesday fiesta includes a corrida de toros.
- Exhacienda de San Salvador, which is currently an orphanage run by Nuestros Pequeños Hermanos.
- Laguna del Rodeo which is a lake with a dam. There are a great variety of fish, birds, and mammals in the area. There are restaurants around the lake.
- Laguna de Coatetelco.
- Acueducto del Terreno.
- La presa vieja de la Toma.

=== Coatetelco archaeological zone ===
Coatetelco is a pre-Hispanic archaeological site located next to the Laguna de Coatetelco (Lake Coatetelco) two km from Alpuyeca. Evidence of nomadic groups goes back 25,000 years, with small farming communities settled in during the Early and Mid-Preclassic Periods (900-500 BCE). The Coatetelco apogee was in the Late Preclassical period (500-150 BCE) with communities of 250 to 500 inhabitants. Excavations demonstrate human occupation influenced by Teotihuacan (450-600 CE).

Xochicalco dominated the area during the Epiclassic Period (700 – 900 CE), after which Coatetelco once again became the leading community in the area. Nearly all the standing architecture at the site was built during the Late Postclassical Period (1350–1521).

Most of the excavation was carried out by Raúl Arana. There is a small pyramid, a ball court, and a circular platform dedicated to the god of wind, Ehécatl. The tallest structure is the Cuauhtlitzin temple, which has a staircase with lateral arches. There was also a female stone figure that was called Cuauhtlitzin.

There is a museum on the site.

== Culture ==
- Feast of Santo Tomás Apóstol, December 21 (Miacatlan). Fireworks, mechanical rides, Corridas de Toros. There is a religious festival on February 11.
- Feast of the Immaculate Conception, Ash Wednesday (Palpan). Corridas de Toros.

Music There are four brass bands that play at the fiestas of Santo Tomás, Molina, La Sumaya, and Santa Cecilia.

Handicrafts. Miacatlan produces ceramics and Palpan produces embroidery.

Food. Regional foods include goat and mutton barbacoa and pork cochinitas. Tamales de Mojarra (a type of fish) in Coatetelco. Cheese and mezcal-based drinks in Palpan.

== See also ==
- List of people from Morelos
