= Tetecala =

- City and Municipality
- Tetecala de la Reforma
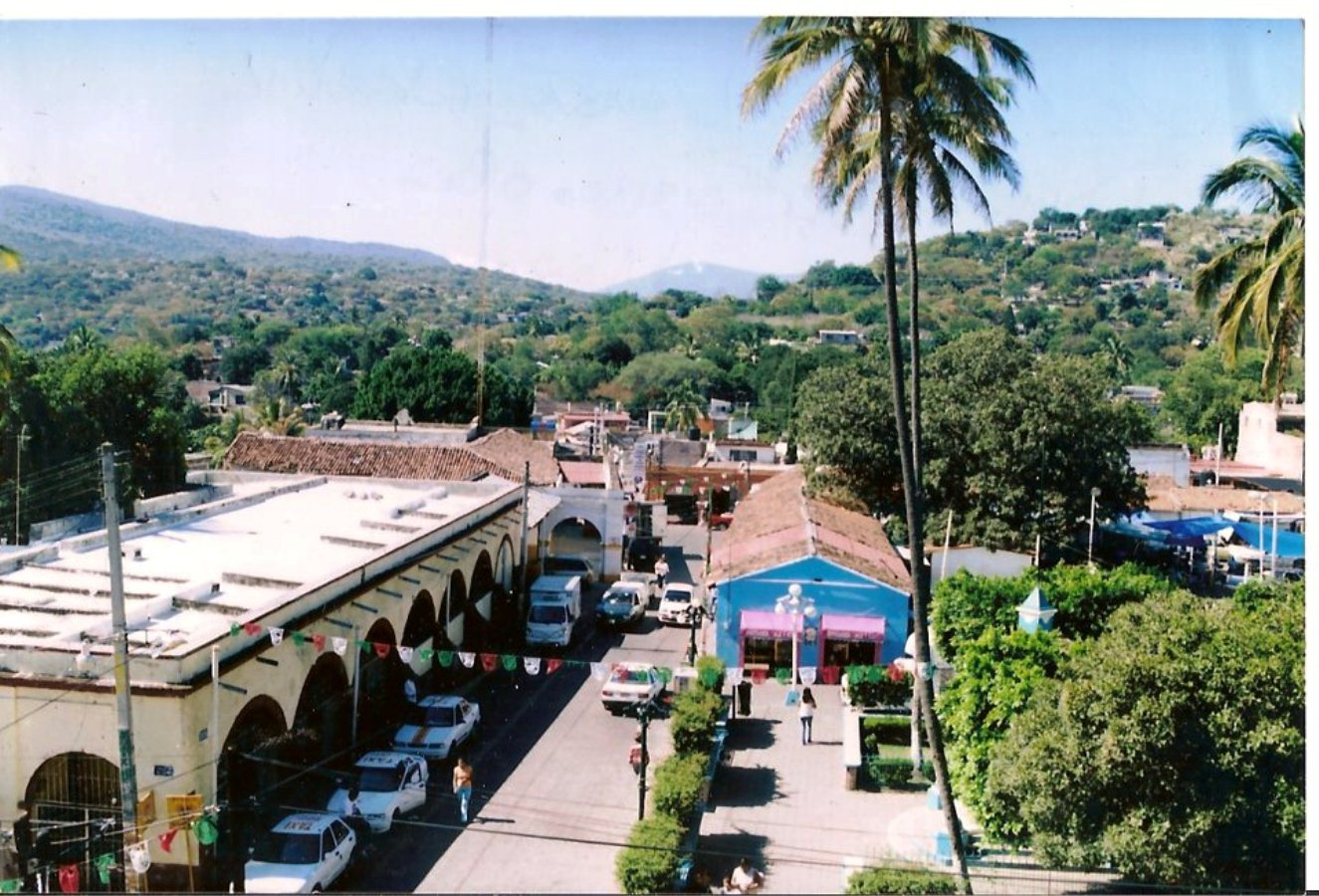

- Coat of arms

- Location in Mexico Tetecala (Mexico)
- Country: Mexico
- State: Morelos
- Founded: 1583
- City: December 11, 1873
- Municipal seat: May 17, 1930

Area
  - Municipality: 53.26 km^{2} (20.56 sq mi)
- Elevation (of seat): 994 m (3,261 ft)

Population (2010) Municipality
  - Municipality: 6,473
- Time zone: UTC−6 (CST)
- Postal code (of seat): 62620
- Area code: 751
- Website: Official site (in Spanish)

Tetecala is a city in the Mexican state of Morelos.

The city serves as the municipal seat for the surrounding municipality, with which it shares a name. The toponym Tetecala comes from a Nahuatl name and means "place of stone houses". The full name of the town is Tetecala de la Reforma because the Laws of the Reforma were signed there in the mid-19th century.

The municipality reported 7,772 inhabitants in the 2015 census.

== History ==
=== Prehispanic history ===
Vestiges of Olmec, Chichimeca, and Tlahuica Prehispanic human settlements have been found in the area that includes modern Tetecals. It is evident that there were settlements of different sizes and that it was an important place of passage between the manors of Coatlán and Mazatepec.

=== Colonial history ===
Tetecala was founded between 1521 and 1583 when it first appears on a map. By 1594 it was called San Francisco de Tetecala and it was an important agricultural center. Cuautitla was founded about this time.

By 1746, Tetecala and the surrounding area had 266 families of "Indians" and 32 of "Spaniards and Mestizos", as well as some of "Mulatos." Eighty years later, the population had increased to 4,040 inhabitants that were distributed in the town of Tetecala, five haciendas, and ten ranches. By Royal Decree of December 4, 1786, the Municipality of Tetecala corresponded to the State of Mexico.

The fertile plain of Tetecala was considered the most luxuriant in the jurisdiction of Cuernavaca. Several 17th and 18th century travelers described the area as "very entertaining and fun".

=== 19th Century and early independence ===
The local parish priest, Andrés González Meraz, illegally seized lands in Tlatempan. One of the last battles of the Mexican War of Independence took place in Tetecala on June 2, 1821, when Pedro Ascencio Alquicira attacked royalist Dionisio Boheta. Ascencio was killed the following day.

The municipality of Tetecalpa was founded as a part of the State of Mexico on August 6, 1824. An 1826 census reported 651 day-laborers, 50 farmers, 20 artisans, 19 merchants, two manufacturers of brandy, two presbyters, a surgeon, a teacher, and a responsible civil authority. Commerce stands out since Tetecala had a smaller population than Xochitepec, Tlaltizapán, Puente de Ixtla, or Tlaquiltenango, but it had more commercial activity than any of them. Sugar cane, bananas, huacamote (sic) (tomatoes?), jicama, plums, watermelons, mamey, corn and beans were grown locally.

There was a peasant revolt in Tetecala, Miacatlan, and Xochitepec in 1848. Lt. Manuel Arellano led the fight against the hacienda owners, who were supported by Kad Waleder, leader of the American troops who had invaded in 1847. Tetecala supported Juan Alvarez during the La Reforma (1854−1857). During the ensuing war, Tetecala sheltered Benito Juarez, the Lerdo de Tejada brothers, Ignacio Manuel Altamirano, Ignacio Ramírez "El Nigromante", Guillermo Prieto, Manuel Doblado, José María Iglesias, and others. The Masonic Lodge La Palanca was founded in 1857.

The state of Morelos was established in 1869; the Villa de Tetecala became a city and adopted the name Tetecala de la Reforma on December 11, 1873.

=== 20th Century and revolution ===
At the outbreak of the Mexican Revolution in 1910, the owners of the haciendas of Contlalco, Cuautitla, Actopan, and Santa Cruz and wealthy merchants fled the municipality. Several groups of peasants joined the rebel Zapatista forces. Atrocities were committed by both sides in the conflict, although the terrorism spread by Carranza general Pablo González Garza was without precedent.

The distillery and ice house "La Morelense" functioned from 1935 to 1936. There were several sugar and rice mills in the community, which were dismantled in the late 1950s and early 1960s. Former employees became low-income wage earners, and many joined the popular movement led by Rubén Jaramillo. When Jamarillo and his family were gunned down by federal police in 1962, his body was taken to the "Miguel Hidalgo Hospital" (now the House of Culture) in Tetecala for autopsy, which was performed by Dr. Ernesto González Brito.

During the 1990s, Amado Carrillo Fuentes, known as El Señor de los Cielos (Lord of the Skies) used to hold fiestas for his drug-dealing friends at his home in Tetecala while the government of Jorge Carrillo Olea seemingly looked the other way.

=== 21st Century ===
The Escuela de Estudios Superiores de Tetecala (School of Higher Education of Tetecala), affiliated with the Morelos State University opened in August 2016 in Mazatepec. The initial programs were in nursing and nutrition; a program for Rural Surgeons opened in January 2018. The school had 208 students; the rector of the UAEM was Gustavo Urquiza Beltrán, and the first director of the school in Tetecala was Miriam Tapia.

Six people died during the September 19, 2017 earthquake.

The state of Morelos reported 209 cases and 28 deaths due to the COVID-19 pandemic in Mexico as of April 27, 2020; two cases were reported in Tetecala. Schools and many businesses were closed from mid March until June 1. On July 2, Tetecala reported 11 infections and three deaths from the virus; the reopening of the state was pushed back until at least June 13. Tetecala reported 13 cases, 13 recuperations, but no deaths from the virus as of August 31. Twenty-two cases were reported on December 27, 2020.

== Tourism and attractions ==
The church of San Francisco of Assisi is in the historic center of Tetecala. It was built in the 18th century in Neoclassic style. The chapel of the Virgin of Candlemas, also from the 18th century, is located on the federal highway. There is a colonial-era fountain in front of the chapel of the Alma de de la Virgin.

The area along the Chalma River has lush vegetation, a variety of fruit trees, and abundant fauna. There are old historic mansions housing the House of Culture and the regional public library. President Benito Juarez stayed here when he visited the city in 1857.

The water park "La Playa", which features five pools and offers alternative medicine, is found in the municipality. There is a panoramic view of the town from the top of the hill of "Las Cruces". Cascos de las Haciendas (manor houses) nearby include Santa Cruz Vista Alegre, Actopan, Cuautlita, and Cocoyotla).

The traditional tianguis (market) is on Tuesday.

== Culture ==
Local fiestas are held on February 2 (Virgen de la Candelaria) in Tetecala, May 15 (St. Isidore the Laborer) in Actopan, July 31 (St. Ignatius of Loyola) in Actopan, September 29 (St. Michael the Archangel) in Cuautitla, October 4 (San Francisco de Asís) in Tetecala, and December 12 (Virgin of Guadalupe) in the "El Paso" neighborhood.

There are two brass bands, one Cuautlita and another in Tetecala. Tetecala was the birthplace of several well-known performers and composers.

Saddle-making and basket weaving are local handicrafts.

Local food includes corn or chickpea pozole with pork, chicken and even shrimp; beef jerky with cream and cheese or pork enchilada; green pip mole, red turkey mole, fish in mixiote, tamal, and clemole seasoned with wild plums and tamarind; peppers stuffed with cheese and mincemeat, and huazontles. Traditional sweets such as pumpkin, sweet pipían, crystallized fruit, quince, tejocote, fruits in syrup, cajeta (crystalized goat's milk), buñuelos, and ice cream are also made.

== Communities ==
Tetecala de la Reforma is the municipal seat. Colonias El Charco, San Francisco Sarabia, and El Cerrito de las Cruces are parts of the city. The city is 47 km (29 miles) south of Cuernavaca and 135 km (84 miles) from Mexico City.

Cuautlita is located 6 km southeast of the Tetecala de la Reforma and includes Colonia Mariano Matamoros.

Contlalco is 25 km south of Tetecala de la Reforma.

Actopan is 1 km west of Tetecala de la Reforma.

== See also ==
- List of people from Morelos
