= List of people from Morelos =

The following are people who were born, raised, or who gained significant prominence for living in the Mexican state of Morelos:

This list is dynamic and incomplete. You can help by expanding it with reliably sourced entries.

== Actors, entertainers, and film-makers ==
- Lilia Aragón (1938–2021, born in Cuautla) was a Mexican film, television and stage actress.
- Socorro Avelar (1925–2003) was a Mexican actress who was born in Cuernavaca.
- Martha Mariana Castro (born in Cuautla in 1966) is a Mexican actress. She was married to actor Fernando Luján (1939–2019), with whom she has a son, Franco Paolo Ciangherotti.
- Ana Bertha Espín (b. in Tehuixtla in 1956) is a Mexican actress. Amor real (2004) and La que no podía amar (2012).
- Abraham Enzástiga Menes is the director of the Jojutla Symphony Orchestra, which he founded in 2016.
- Virginia Fábregas García (1871–1950) was a Mexican film and stage actress active in the early 20th-Century born in Yautepec. She appeared in films between 1931 and 1945. There is a street in Cuernavaca and a school in Yautepec named for her.
- María Félix (1914–2002), was a Mexican actress who lived in Cuernavaca. She had an opulent, cobalt-blue and papaya-colored villa on Avenida Palmira, along with five other houses. It is known as the Casa de las Tortugas (House of the Turtles) and has Louis XV beds, is adorned with silk brocades, Venetian mosaics, Talavera urns, marble fireplaces, sixteenth-century Spanish armor, Italian gilded chairs, and portraits of her created by Antoine Tzapoff.
- Emilio Fernández (1904–1986) filmed Puebito (1962) in Olintepec, Ayala.
- Helen Hayes (1900–1993) was an American actress who had a home in Cuernavaca.
- Katy Jurado (1924–2002), was a Mexican and Hollywood actress of film, television, and theater.
- es:León Larregui (b. 1973, Cuernavaca), singer for rock band Zoé best known for spreading fake news about COVID-19 vaccines.
- Armando Manzanero (b. Mérida, 1935—d. 2020), Mexican musician and songwriter, had a home on Calle 16 de Septiembre, Acapantzingo, Cuernavaca.
- Charles Mingus (1922–1979) was an American jazz musician who died in Cuernavaca on January 5, 1979.
- Mariano Moreno Cantinflas (1911–1993) was a Mexican entertainer who had a home in Cuernavaca.
- Renata Notni (b. 1995 in Cuernavaca) is a Mexican actress and model.
- Leticia Palma (Zoyla Gloria Ruiz Moscoso), 1926 – 2009 actress (En la palma de tu mano), born in Tabasco, died in Cuernavaca.
- Salvador Quiroz (1892–1956) was a Mexican film actor born in Cuautla. He appeared in 22 movies, including Michael Strogoff (1944), Crime and Punishment (1951), and Pablo and Carolina.
- Claudio Reyes Rubio (b. 1964 in Mexico City, d. 2017 in Cuernavaca), TV director (Televisa).
- Carlos Reygadas (born 1971) is a Mexican filmmaker who has shot movies in Morelos. and lives in Tepoztlan.
- Sofía Sisniega (b. 1989 in Cuernavaca) is a Mexican actress, best known for her role as Sofia López-Haro in the 2013 Mexican adaptation, Gossip Girl: Acapulco.
- Chavela Vargas (1919 – August 5, 2012) was a Costa Rican singer who lived in Cuernavaca.
- Jack Wagner (1891–1963) was an American filmmaker. In 1945 Wagner and friend John Steinbeck visited Cuernavaca, which inspired the latter to write both a book and a screenplay about Emiliano Zapata.
- Rosemarie Bowe Stack (1932 – 2019) was an American model, best known for her appearances in several films in the 1950s who lived in Villa del Sole, Cuernavaca.

== Athletes ==
=== Football ===
- Sindey Balderas (born in Cuernavaca in 1976) was a footballer with the Tigres UANL and Indios de Ciudad Juárez.
- Raúl Cárdenas (b. 1928 in Mexico City, d. 2016 in Cuernavaca), footballer (Zacatepec) and coach (Cruz Azul, national team).
- Lucero Cuevas Flores (born 1996 in Cuernavaca) is a footballer who plays for Club América.
- Rafael Cuevas Sánchez (born 1980 in Jiutepec) is a retired football goalkeeper. He is currently the goalkeeper coach for Club America.
- Diana Fierro Delgado (born 1995 in Cuernavaca) is a professional football midfielder who currently plays for América of the Liga MX Femenil.
- Gerardo Flores Zúñiga (born 1986 in Xochitepec) is a professional footballer who plays for Cruz Azul.
- Gerardo Galindo Martínez (born 1978 in Cuernavaca) is a former professional footballer (1997–2013).
- Gienir García Figueroa (born 1989 in Zacatepec) is a former professional footballer (2008–2014).
- Gustavo Enrique García Figueroa (born 1980 in Zacatepec) is a Mexican footballer, who plays as a defender for San Luis F.C.
- Carlos Alberto Hurtado Arteaga (born 1984 in Zacatepec) is a professional footballer who currently plays for Correcaminos UAT on loan from Necaca.
- Pablo Larios Iwasaki (b. 1960 in Zacatepec d. January 31, 2019) was a football goalkeeper from 1980 to 1999. He played on the Mexico National Team from 1993 to 1991.
- Manuel Mariaca (born 1986 in Cuernavaca) is a former Mexican footballer. He last played for Cruz Azul Hidalgo as a defender in Mexico's Primera Division.
- Roberto Nurse Anguiano (born 1983 in Zacatepec) is a Panamanian footballer who currently plays for Mineros de Zacatecas on loan from Dorados de Sinaloa and the Panama national football team.
- Mónica Ocampo Medina (born 1987 in Jojutla) is a Mexican professional footballer who plays as a forward for Pachuca and the Mexico women's national football team.
- Sergio Orduña (born 1954, in Xochitepec) is a Mexican football manager and was a former manager Altamira F.C. (2014–2015) of Ascenso MX.
- Jesús Ortega Benítez (born 1997 in Cuernavaca) is a professional Mexican footballer who currently plays for Zacatepec.
- José Eduardo Pavez (born 1969 in Tehuixtla) is a retired professional footballer from Mexico. He played as a midfielder during his career. He was a member of the Mexico national football team competing at the 1992 Summer Olympics in Barcelona, Spain.
- Jair Pereira Rodríguez (born 1986 in Cuautla) is a Mexican football defender who currently plays for Liga MX team C.D. C.D. Guadalajara.
- Ignacio Rodríguez Bahena (born 1956 in Zacatepec) is a former Mexican football goalkeeper who played for Mexico in the 1986 FIFA World Cup.
- Boris Romero (born in Cuernavaca in 1997) is a Mexican football defender who currently plays for Deportivo Toluca of the Liga MX Femenil.
- Moctezuma Serrato Salinas (born 1976, Cuernavaca) is a Mexican retired professional football striker (1999–2012).
- Pamela Tajonar Alonso (born in Cuernavac in 1984) is a Mexican footballer who plays as a goalkeeper for Barcelona (2018–).
- Alan Vidal Solís (born 1993 in Zacualpan) is a Mexican professional footballer who plays for Athletic Morelos. The club was founded in 2007 and currently plays in Mexico's Third Division.

=== Other sports ===
- Luis Avilés Ferreiro is a sprinter who won 2nd place in the 2019 Mexican Olympics in Chihuahua, Chihuahua.
- Juan Ramón Ayala (born in Cuernavaca in 1989) is a professional boxer in the Light Welterweight division of the WBC.
- Francisco García Moreno (1947–2016) was born in Mexico City. He was on the Mexican water polo teams at the 1968, 1972, and 1976 Olympics. He ran a gym in Las Palmas, Cuernavaca, and was killed in 2016.
- Juan Carlos Gonzales (born 1962 in Cuernavaca), better known under the ring name El Hijo del Diablo ("The Son of the Devil"), is a Mexican professional wrestler.
- Ismael Hernández (born in Cuautla in 1990) is a Mexican modern pentathlete. He won a bronze medal at the 2016 Summer Olympics.
- Idulio Islas (born 1987 in Morelos) is a Mexican Taekwondo practitioner. He won a silver medal for the 68 kg division at the 2009 World Taekwondo Championships in Copenhagen, Denmark.
- Ricardo Lopez (born in Cuernavaca in 1966) is a retired undefeated Mexican professional boxer. "El Finito" López Nava is one of just fifteen world boxing champions to retire without a loss.
- Uri Martins (born in Cuernavaca, 1990) is a Mexican cyclist riding for Amore & Vita–Prodir.
- Laura Lorenza Morfin Macouzet (born 1982 in Cuernavaca) is a road cyclist. She represented Mexico at the 2006, 2008, and 2009 UCI Road World Championships.
- Irving Adrián Pérez Pineda (born in Jojutla May 16, 1986) is a Mexican triathlete. He competed in the men's event at the 2016 Summer Olympics.
- Valeria Pulido Velasco (born in Jojutla, 1990) is a former professional tennis player.
- Marcel Sisniega Campbell (1959–2013) grew up in Cuernavaca. He was a Mexican chess Grandmaster and film director. Sisniega was born in Chicago but grew up in Cuernavaca. Sisniega earned the Grandmaster title in 1992.

== Criminals ==
- Daniel Arizmendi López (born 1958) is a convicted Mexican kidnapper responsible for at least 18 kidnappings in Mexico. He was nicknamed El Mochaorejas ("The Ear Chopper").
- Arturo Beltran Leyva (1961—2009) was Number 3 on the Mexican government's Most Wanted List when he was killed by the Navy at his home in the "Altitude" apartments in Cuernavaca on December 16, 2009.
- Amado Carrillo Fuentes (1956—1997) was a drug lord knows as El Señor de los Cielos (the Lord of the Skies). Born in Sinaloa, Carrillo Fuentes owed a good deal of his infamy to alleged ties to Governor Jorge Carrillo Olea.
- Sam Giancana (1908—1975) was a Chicago mobster who lived in Cuernavaca while he was on the lam from both the FBI and the mob, (1966–1974).

== Farmers, landowners, entrepreneurs, investors ==
After the Spanish conquest and until the early 20th century, land ownership was centered largely on haciendas. Based on the Constitution of 1915, General Alvaro Obregon established the Ley de Ejidos in 1920 which essentially established communal ownership of rural lands.

- Eugenio J. Cañas (?-1923), brought running water and electricity to Cuernavaca; surveyed the border between Morelos and Puebla
- José de la Borda (c. 1699–1778) was a Spanish miner who made a fortune in Taxco, Guerrero. In 1760 he built a large mansion in Cuernavaca.
- Manuel de la Borda (baptized 1727–1791) was the son of José de la Borda. Born in Taxco, he became a priest and was in Cuernavaca in 1777, when he built the chapel of Guadalupe next to his father's mansion. In 1778 he initiated the transformation of the mansion into a botanical garden. Today the Borda Garden is a public park and museum.
- Alberto Gómez was born in Tepecoacuilco, Guerrero. He was a rice farmer in Jojutla who won a medal at the 1900 Paris exhibition for the "Best rice in the world."
- Dwight Morrow (1873–1931) was an American businessman and diplomat. He had a home called Casa de Manaña in Cuernavaca and hired Diego Rivera to paint the murals on the Palace of Cortes.
- Pedro Cortes Ramirez de Arellano (died 1629) was the grandson of Hernán Cortés. He owned the Hacienda of San Nicolás in Pantitlán, Tlayacapan.
- Rosalia Del Socorro Castillon was born in Cuernavaca. Castillon has built her family's business, De Antaño Azucarillos into the most famous sweet shop in Morelos. It is a franchise operation that has recently opened in Guatemala. They sell fruit/based salad dressing, jellies, and jam.
- Martín Cortés, 2nd Marquis of the Valley of Oaxaca (1532–1589) was born in Cuernavaca. He was the legitimate son of Hernán Cortés and Doña Juana de Zúñiga. He founded and owned several haciendas.
- Rose Eleanor King (b. in India, 1865) and Norman Robson King (d. 1907 in Mexico City) were British subjects who first arrived in Cuernavaca in 1905. They established their residence in Mexico City, but after her husband's death, Ms. King returned to Cuernavaca to live. In 1910 she purchased the Hotel Bella Vista, which hosted Francisco I. Madero, Felipe Ángeles, Huerta, the Guggenheim family, and others, only to abandon it in 1914. She returned to Cuernavaca in 1916 where she later died. She was the author of Tempest Over Mexico: A Personal Chronicle.
- Claudia Ríos is the administrative manager of La Walfaria franchise. Founded in 2003, there are nine franchises in Mexico, one in Ecuador, one in Guatemala, and one in Honduras.
- Ricardo Sánchez (b. 1798) from Guadalajara, Jalisco, moved to Jojutla on March 15, 1830, and in 1836 he introduced the cultivation of brown rice. He later became the first municipal president.

== Military figures ==
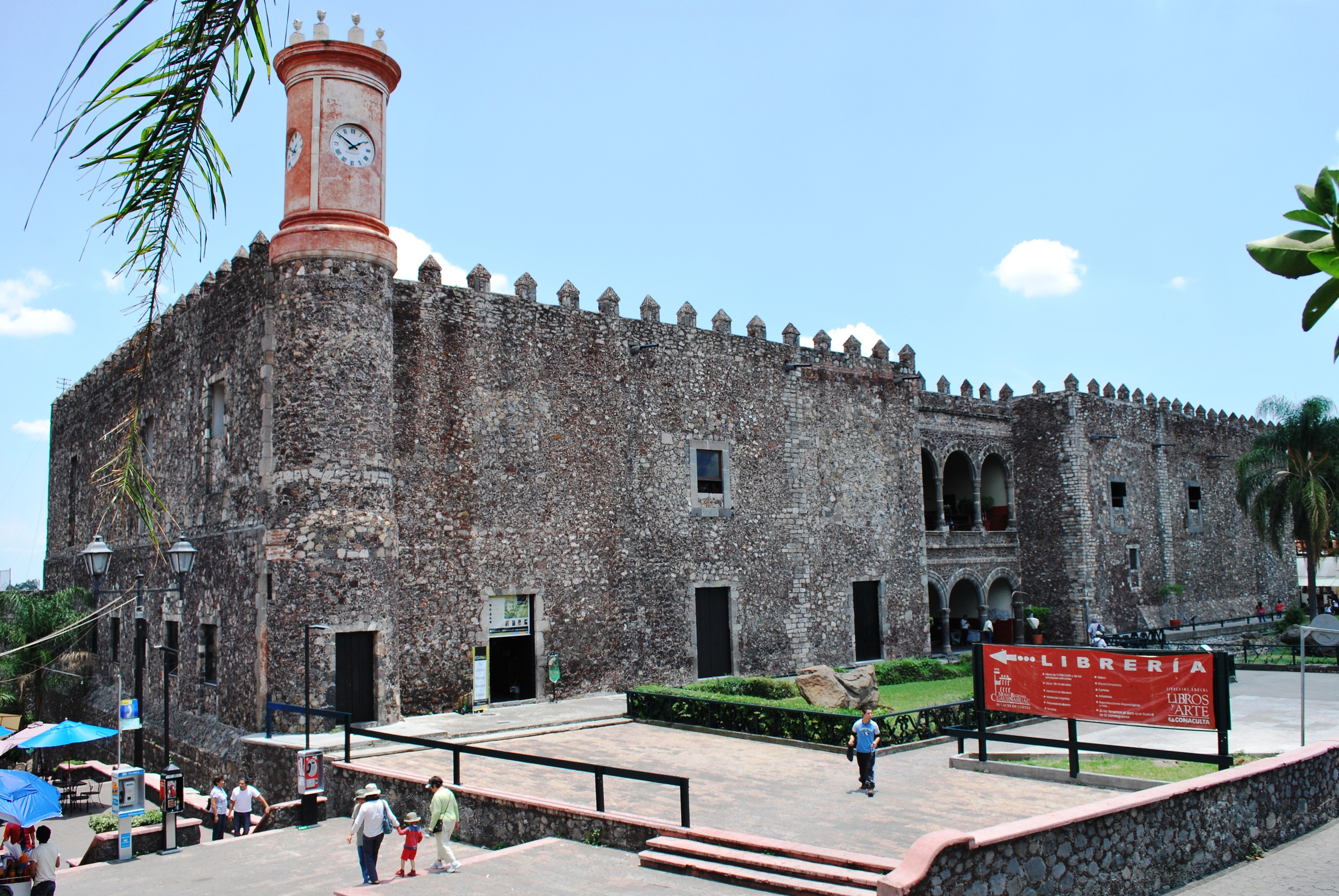
Palace of Cortés, Cuernavaca built by Indigenous.

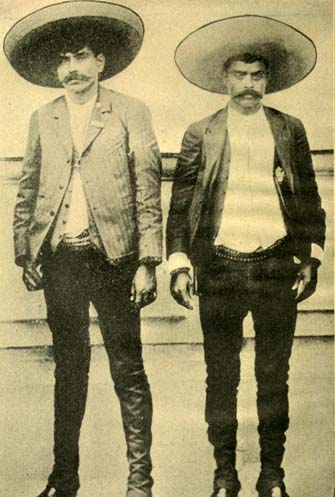
Photo of Emiliano Zapata (right) and his brother Eufemio (left).

- Pedro Ascencio Alquisiras (?-1820), Insurgente who died in Tetecala, December 28, 1820
- Colonel Francisco Ayala (d. 1812) was the first Insurgent leader in Morelos state. His hometown, Ciudad Ayala, is named for him.
- General Vicente Aranda (died 1926) was born in the hacienda of Cuauchichinola and joined the Zapatista forces in March 1911 under the orders of General Lorenzo Vásquez. He participated in the capture of Jojutla and Tlaquiltenango, on March 24, 1911. In 1921 he was elected Federal Deputy for the first district of the State of Morelos. Later he was municipal president of Jojutla and died there on July 22, 1926. There is a town named for him in the municipality of Jojutla.
- Leonardo Bravo (general officer) (1764–1812) was an Insurgent who fought at the Siege of Cuautla with brothers Miguel and Victor, as well as his son, Nicolas Bravo.
- Nicolás Bravo (1786–1854), Insurgent, fought at Siege of Cuautla, president of Mexico three times between 1839 and 1846.
- Félix María Calleja del Rey (1755–1828). Born in Medina de Campo, Spain, Calleja arrived in New Spain in 1789. He became an able fighter for the Royalist cause, defeating Miguel Hidalgo in San Jerónimo Aculco in 1811 and stopping Jose Maria Morelos's offensive in 1812. He was Viceroy from 1813 to 1816.
- Sidronio Camacho was a Zapatista general who killed Eufemio Zapata in Cuautla in 1917 and then joined Venustiano Carranza.
- Hernán Cortés (1485–1547) was a Spanish Conquistador (1519–1521) who lived in Cuernavaca from 1530 to 1540 and built the Palace of Cortés, Cuernavaca. He was named Marqués del Valle de Oaxaca in 1529.
- María Estrada (c. 1475 or 1486 – between 1537 and 1548) was a Spanish woman who participated in the expedition of Hernán Cortés to Mexico in 1519–24. The Dominican historian Diego Durán claims that she led a force of conquistadors into the area around Popocatépetl, where she defeated the Nahua Indians of Hueyapan, charging head first and screaming "Santiago!"
- Genovevo de la O (1876–1952) was born in Santa María Ahuacatitlán, Cuernavaca. He joined the Mexican Revolution in 1910 and joined Zapata in 1911. He won the Siege of Cuernavaca (1914) and was elected Governor of Morelos.
- Maria Fermina Rivera (died 1821) was born in Tlaltizapán. Guerrilla of the troops of Vicente Guerrero, died on the battlefield.
- Hermenegildo Galeana (1782–1814) was an Insurgent who fought at the Siege of Cuautla.
- General Julián González Guadarrama (1890–?) was born in the town of Mazatepec on November 30, 1890. He joined the Mexican Revolution in Chontalcoatlán in March 1911 under the command of General Joaquín Miranda of the forces of General Ambrosio Figueroa. Julián González died in Cuernavaca after dedicating himself to agriculture in the same municipality.
- Rubén Jaramillo (1900–1962) was a military and peasant leader born in Tlaquiltenango who was gunned down by federal police in Xochicalco.
- Gildardo Magaña Cerda (1891–1939 in Mexico) was born in Zamora, Michoacán. In 1911 he moved to Morelos and in 1916 he became chief of staff to Emiliano Zapata. On September 4, 1919, in Huautla, Morelos, Magaña was proclaimed the leader of the Liberation Army of the South.
- Mariano Matamoros (1770–1814) was the priest of Jantetelco who fought at the Siege of Cuautla. The Cuernavaca Airport is named for him.
- Narciso Mendoza (1800–1888) or theNiño artillero (Child Gunner). During the Siege of Cuautla in 1812, 12-year-old Mendoza lit and fired a cannon at Spanish troops to protect the barrio of San Diego, Cuautla. There are several monumements to him, including streets, schools, neighborhoods, and statues (in Cuautla and Las Palmas, Cuernavaca.)
- Mixcoatl Camaxtl was a warrior and the father of Quetzalcóatl in Amatlán.
- Otilio Montaño Sánchez (1887–1917) was a Zapatista general born in Villa Ayala. He was a co-author of the Plan de Ayala. He was executed as a traitor to Zapata.
- José María Morelos y Pavón (1765–1815) was a priest who led the Siege of Cuautla (September–May 1812). He was held prisoner in the Palacio de Cortes (November 1815). The state was named after him in 1869.
- Felipe Neri Jiménez (1884–1914) was a soldier and general in the Mexican Revolution. He was born in the neighborhood of Gualupita, in Cuernavaca. He became part of Zapata's ruling Revolutionary Junta in May 1913. He was killed in January 1914, by the Zapatista forces of Antonio Barona Rojas while returning from a campaign in Tepoztlan.
- Amador Salazar Jimenez (1868–1916) was a cousin of Emiliano Zapata who became a revolutionary general. He was born in Cuernavaca and is buried in Tlaltizapán.
- Tezcapotzin, warrior from Cuauhnáhuac who caught Cuautzinten, tlatoani of Xiutepec.
- Pablo Torres Burgos (1877–1911) was born in Ciudad Ayala. Torres Burgos founded the liberation club called Melchor Ocampo in 1909 and became a general in 1911. He is remembered for the phrase, "Down with the haciendas! Long live the people!"
- Tzontecomatl, leader of Tlahuica groups of the Chicomostoc tribe who first arrived in Cuauhnáhuac
- Leondro Valle (1833–1861) was born on February 27, 1833, in Mexico City and grew up in Jonacatepec. He fought at the Battle of Calpulalpan. He was executed on June 23, 1861.
- Emiliano Zapata (1879–1919) was the leader of the southern army during the Mexican Revolution He was born in Anenecuilco and assassinated in Chinameca, both in Ayala. He is buried in Cuautla.
- Eufemio Zapata (1873–1917) was Emiliano Zapata's brother and a participant in the Mexican Revolution. He was killed by Sidronio Camacho in Cuautla.

== Political figures ==
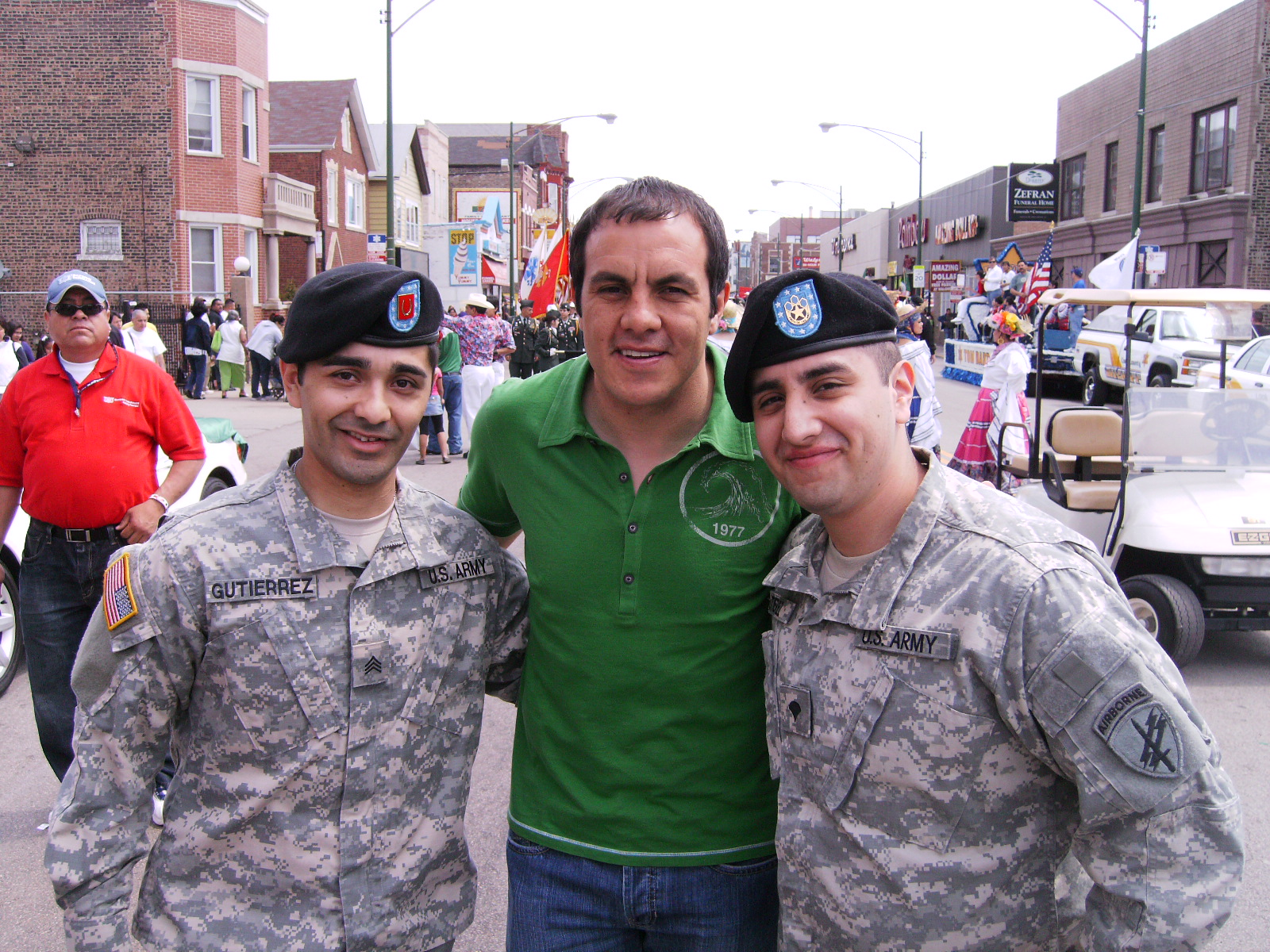
Cuauhtemoc Blanco in Chicago in 2009 during his time with the Chicago Fire

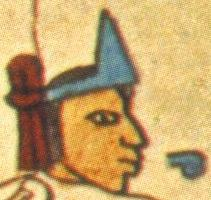
Tezcacohuatzin's grandson Moctezuma I

- Juan Pablo Adame Alemán (born in Cuernavaca, 1985) was a federal deputy (PAN, 2012–2015). He is the son of Governor Marco Adame.
- Marco Antonio Adame Castillo (born in Cuernavaca, 1960) is a doctor and politician who was Governor of Morelos (PAN, 2006–2012).
- Juan N. Álvarez (1790–1867) supported the Plan of Ayutla and was President of Mexico for two months while Cuernavaca was the capital (1855).
- Sergio Álvarez Mata (born in Cuernavaca, 1962) was a federal senator (PAN, 2006–2012).
- Cuauhtemoc Blanco (born 1973) is a former professional soccer player turned politician. He was the Presidente Municipal (mayor) of Cuernavaca from January 2016 to April 2018, and he became Governor of Morelos (PES) on October 1, 2018.
- Plutarco Elías Calles (1877-1945), president (1924-1928) and Jefe Máximo (Maximum Chief) of the Revolution (1928-1934) ruled Mexico with an iron fist from his home in Colonia Reforma, Cuernavaca.
- Lázaro Cárdenas (1895–1970) was a Mexican president (1934–1980) who owned a home in Palmira, Cuernavaca. He donated land to construct a boarding school, Internado de Palmira for young women.
- Jorge Carrillo Olea (born 1937) is a general, politician, and journalist from Jojutla. He was governor from 1994 to 1998 (PRI).
- Francisco de Contreras (¿?-1610), governor of Xochimilco de Cuauhnáhuac
- Cuauhtototzin, tlatoani of Cuauhnahuac in 1400, father of Chichimecacihuatzin I
- Fidel Demédicis Hidalgo (born 1956) is a politician from Temixco. He was a federal senator from 2012 to 2018.
- Domingo Diez (b. in Cuernavaca December 3, 1881 d. April 16, 1934) was a politician during and after the Mexican Revolution. There is a street in Cuernavaca named after him.
- Luis Echeverría (1922–2022), former President of Mexico (PRI 1970–1976) lived in Cuernavaca. As Secretario de Gobernacion (Secretary of the Interior) under President Gustavo Díaz Ordaz, Echeverria is considered responsible for the October 2, 1968 Tlatelolco massacre.
- Sergio Estrada Cajigal (born 1961 in Cuernavaca) is a politician and former Governor of Morelos (PAN, 2000–2006). His grandfather, Vicente Estada Cajigal, was governor from 1930 to 1934.
- Jorge Arturo García Rubí, (b. Cuernavaca, November 21, 1952) is a lawyer and politician, member of the Institutional Revolutionary Party who was Governor of Morelos from May 18 to September 30, 2000.
- Ángel García Yáñez (born 1967) is a Mexican politician affiliated to the New Alliance Party (Nueva Alianza). He served as a senator in the LXIV Legislature of the Mexican Congress (2018–2021) from the state of Morelos. From 2015 to 2018, he represented the Fifth Federal Electoral District of Morelos, centered on Yautepec.
- Margarita González Saravia governor of Morelos (2024-present)
- Flora Guerrero, environmentalist and activist
- Huitzilihuitl (?-1425), tlatoani (ruler) of Cuauhnáhuac (1403-1425)
- Itzcoatzin de Cuauhnáhuac, Tlahuica tlatoani of Cuauhnahuac in 1519.
- Armando León Bejarano (1916–2016) was born in Cuautla and served as Governor of Morelos (PRI, 1976–1982).
- Maximilian I of Mexico (1832–1867) was the Second Emperor of Mexico (1866–1867). He had two homes in Cuernavaca, the Borda Garden and El Olvido in Acapantzingo.
- Lucía Meza Guzmán (born in Cuautla, 1975) is a politician and was senator to the LXIV Legislature of the Mexican Congress from the state of Morelos. Meza Guzmán is affiliated with the National Regeneration Movement (Morena).
- Gisela Mota Ocampo (1982 – 2016 in Mexico) was a Mexican politician affiliated with the PRD. As of 2013, she served as a plurinominal deputy in the LXII Legislature of the Mexican Congress, representing Morelos. After winning the elections in June 2015, Mota Ocampo became mayor of Temixco on January 1, 2016, serving until her assassination the following day, on January 2, 2016.
- Claudia Ochoa Carrillo from Xochitepec was the first female municipal president in Morelos (1967–1969).
- Lauro Ortega Martínez (1910–1999) was a veterinarian and a politician who served as Governor of Morelos (1982–1988) who lived in Xochitepec.
- Epigmenio de la Piedra (1792-1873), Deputy from Cuernavaca who signed the 1824 Constitution of Mexico
- Graco Ramirez (born June 26, 1949) is a politician who was Governor of Morelos (PRD, 2012–2018).
- Antonio Riva Palacio (1926–2014) was a politician and Governor of Morelos (PRI, 1988–1994). He was Ambassador to Ecuador (1994–1998).
- Tehuehuetzin (¿?-1504), lord, king of Cuauhnáhuac in 1491.
- Tezcacohuatzin (b. 1359) was Lord of Cuauhnáhuac and grandfather of Moctezuma I. His daughter Miahuaxihuitl (b. 1385) married Huitzilihuitl (b. 1379), Aztec emperor.
- Juan Antonio Tlaxcoapan (d. 1813) was an Indigeous and citizen of Spain native of Jojutla who served as alderman in Tlaquiltenango during the Mexican War of Independence. He had talks with Vicente Guerrero and Nicolas Bravo prior to the Congress of Chilpancingo. He was executed by firing squad in the atrium of the church of Santo Domingo in Tlaquiltenango in late 1813.
- Yoatzin, last tlatoani of Cuauhnahuac. Surrendered to Hernán Cortés on April 3, 1521. His baptismal name was Hernando Cuauhnáhuac Cortés y Sandoval.

== Religious figures ==
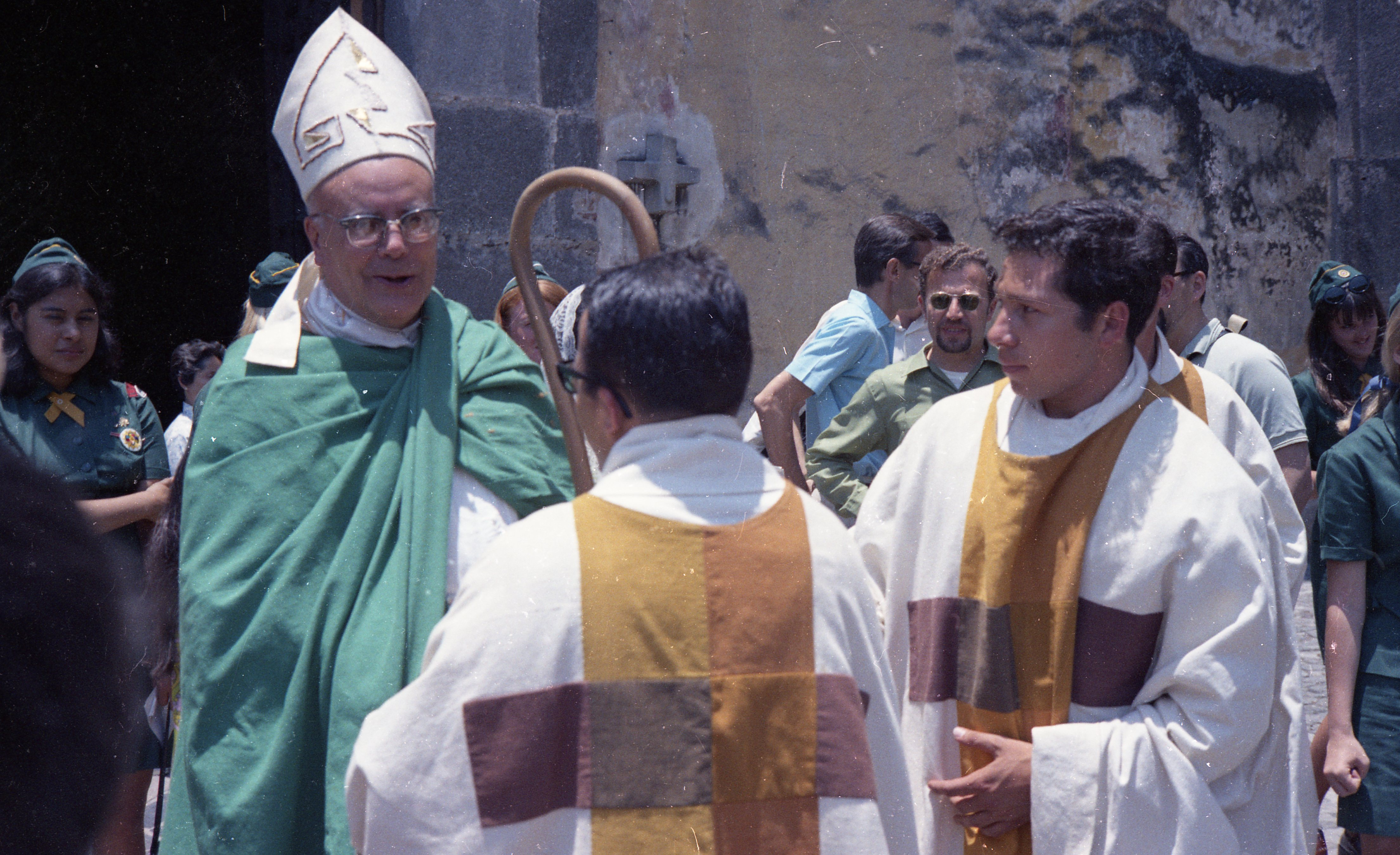
Sergio Méndez Arceo, bishop of Cuernavaca, exiting his cathedral in 1970

- Bernardino Álvarez de San Hipólito, founder of the Hospital de la Santa Cruz in Oaxtepec
- Agustina Andrade (1695-?), discovered the Virgen de Tlaltenango on August 30, 1720
- Domingo de la Anunciación (16th century), evangelizer of Tepoztlán who destroyed the ídol of Ometochtli de Tepoztlán
- Fray Jorge de Avila (ordained 1526, died 1547) was an Augistinian monk who founded monasteries in Atlathucan, Tlayacapan, Ocuituco, Yecapixtla, and Totolapan. All these monasteries are part of the UNESCO World Heritage Sites.
- Pelagio Antonio de Labastida y Dávalos (b. 1816 in Zamora, Michoacán), Roman Catholic archbishop and Mexican politician who served as regent during the Second Mexican Empire (1863–1864) (d. 1891 in Oacalco, Yautepec)
- Diego Durán (c. 1537 – 1588) was a Dominican friar best known for his authorship of one of the earliest Western books on the history and culture of the Aztecs, The History of the Indies of New Spain. Durán became vicar at the convent in Hueyapan (1581).
- Jacobo Grinberg (born 1946; disappeared December 8, 1994) is/was a shaman who frequently studied in Tepoztlan and mysteriously disappeared in Cuernavaca.
- Ivan Illich (1926–2002) was a Catholic priest & philosopher who co-founded the Centro Intercultural de Documentación in Rancho Tetela in 1965.
- Gregorio Lemercier (1912-1987), founder of the monastery of Santa María de la Resurrección in Santa María Ahucatitlán
- Baltasar López Bucio (born 1938) is a Catholic priest. He was a promoter of Liberation Theology and a follower of bishop Sergio Mendez. As the pastor of the church in Tlatenango, Cuernavaca, he commissioned Roberto Martínez García to paint a mural that reflected that tradition of veneration of the Virgin Mary at the old church (said to be the oldest church in continental America). The mural includes Emiliano Zapata, Diego Rivera, Hernán Cortés, and Baltasar on pilgrimage to the church. Later he served as pastor of the parish in Acapantzingo, Cuernavaca.
- Manuel Pío López Estrada (1891–1971). Priest born in Jojutla, 6th bishop of Veracruz, and first archbishop of Xalapa (1939–1968).
- José Agapito Mateo Minos Campuzano (1852–1938), priest and historian from Jojutla.
- Sergio Méndez Arceo (1907-1991) was a bishop of Cuernavaca, 1953–1982. He was a leading proponent of Liberation Theology.
- Florencio Olvera Ochoa, (1933–2020), Bishop of Roman Catholic Diocese of Cuernavaca (2002–2009).
- Ozomatzintentli, lord of Cuauhnáhuac, shaman
- Francisco Plancarte y Navarrete (1856–1920) was a Roman Catholic Bishop of Cuernavaca (1898–1911) and an Archbishop of Monterrey. He is best known for his work as an archaeologist.
- Juan Jesús Posadas Ocampo (1926–1993) was a Roman Catholic bishop of Cuernavaca (1983–1987) and an archbishop and cardinal of Guadalajara (1987–1993).
- Antonio de Roa (1491-?), Augustinian monk who lived in Totolapan. He walked on coals and left the Christ of Totolapan.
- Angelo de San Alberto, Dominican friar who built the aqueduct of Santo Domingo Tlaquiltenango in 1760

== Royalty ==
- Barbara Hutton (1912–1979) the Poor Little Rich Girl was an American heiress who had a home in Jiutepec.
- Princess Maria Beatrice of Savoy (b. 1943) was the youngest daughter of Umberto II of Italy. She lived in Acapantzingo, Cuernavaca, from 1971 until her husband's murder in 1999.
- Frances Erskine Inglis, (1806–1882), Marquesa Calderón de la Barca, was a Scottish woman who married Ángel Calderón de la Barca. Calderon de la Barca was the first plenipotentiary prime minister of Spain in independent Mexico. Francis Erskine Ingles arrived in Cuernavaca in 1841 and went to Atlacumolco, Jiutepec. She wrote Life in Mexico in 1843, with a preface by the historian William H. Prescott.
- Moctezuma I (1390–1469) was the 5th Tlatoani of Tenochtitlan and 2nd Aztec emperor (1440–1469). He established a palace in Pozo Azul, Huaxtepec. Grandson of Tezcacohuatzin, Lord of Cuauhnáhuac.
- Mohammad Reza Pahlavi (1919–1980) was the Shah of Iran (1941–1979). He lived in exile in Cuernavaca in 1979. He fell ill and was taken to New York City for treatment on October 22, 1979—two weeks before the Iran hostage crisis.

== Scientists and inventors ==
- Carlos Arias Ortiz is a biochemist who lives in Cuernavaca and works at the UNAM.
- Ricardo Alberto Castañeda, traditional healer and author from Xoxocotla, Morelos
- Ce Acatl Topiltzin (c. 895–947) was born in Amatlan and is often associated with Quetzalcoatl, who invented pulque. He was a Toltec king (977–999).
- Alejandra Bravo de la Parra (born 1961 in Mexico City) is a biochemist who lives in Cuernavaca and works at the UNAM.
- Hector Lamadrid-Figueroa (born in Cuernavaca in 1976) is head of the Department of Perinatal Health at the National Institute of Public Health of Mexico (INSP). He was a consultant with MEASURE Evaluation from 2011 to 2015, in Mexico, South Africa, India, and Nepal. He has been a collaborator of the Global Burden of Disease study since 2015.
- Timothy Leary (1920–1996). American psychologist and counterculture figure conducted early experiments into the effects of psychedelic drugs in Cuernavaca from 1960 to 1964.
- Susana López Charretón (born 1957 in Mexico City) is a Mexican virologist who lives in Cuernavaca and works at the UNAM. She is married to Carlos Arias Ortiz.
- Andrés Eloy Martínez Rojas (born 1963) was born in Cuernavaca and lives in Jojutla. In 2006 he discovered and named the Jojutla crater on Mars. From 2012 to 2015 he represented the 4th district (Jojutla) in the state legislature as a member of Morena.
- Alfredo Quinto is a physicalchemical researcher at the National Technological Institute of Mexico, assigned to the Tec de Zacatepec. In 2016 he became the first Mexican scientist to win the Newton International Fellowship for studies at the University of Oxford.
- Alexander von Humboldt (1769–1859) was a Prussian naturalist who visited Cuernavaca in 1803 and nicknamed it the City of Eternal Spring.

== Visual artists ==
- David Alfaro Siqueiros (1896–1974) was a Mexican muralist who lived and worked in Cuernavaca. His former studio is now a museum located in a public park named for him.
- Rafael Cauduro (1950-2022) Mexican painter, muralist, and sculptor who lived in Cuernavaca most of his life. His work includes the murals at the "Suprema Corte de Justicia de la Nación" building, the mural in the "Edificio Cauduro" in La Condesa, Mexico City, the murals at the Insurgentes metro station in Mexico City, and "Historia en el Cabús", which is permanently exhibited at Los Pinos in Mexico City. He died at his home in Cuernavaca.
- Lizette Arditti was born in Mexico City in 1947 and has lived in Tepoztlan since 1977.
- Robert Brady (1928–1986) was an American art collector and heir to the Mayflower Movers fortune. He bought and restored the former bishop's residence in Cuernavaca, which today houses the Robert Brady Museum.
- Enrique Cattaneo y Cramer (born February 9, 1946) was born in Mexico City and lives in Cuernavaca. He teaches at the UAEM.
- Cristina Cassy, Mexican painter who won the 3rd place medal in the Salon de Oro in Madrid, Spain, in 1960, lives in Acapantzingo, Cuernavaca.
- Jorge Cázares Campos (b. Cuernavaca November 20, 1937, d. Cuernavaca January 11, 2020) landscape painter, studied at the Universidad Autonoma del Estado de Morelos where he taught since 1976
- Rafael Coronel, 87, painter (b. 1931 in Zacatecas, d. 2019 in Cuernavaca)
- Vicente Gandia Sanz (1935–2009) was born in Barcelona, Spain, and died in Cuernavaca.
- Alfredo Guati Rojo (1918–2003) was a Mexican painter who lived in Cuernavaca as a child.
- Paula Lazos (1940–2010) was a Mexican painter who was born in Cuernavaca and who studied at the UAEM.
- Joy Laville, (b. 1923 in U.K., died 2018; nationalized Mexican painter and sculptor who lived in Jiutepec.
- Liliana Mercenario Pomeroy was born in Mexico city in 1955 and has lived in Cuernavaca since 1994. She teaches at the UAEM.
- Wolfgang Paalen (1907-1959), Austrian-Mexican surrealist painter who lived and worked in Tepoztlàn during his last Mexican period (1954–59).
- Sebastián Ortega (1628-?), religious painter Cuernavaca. "Notario de la Inquisición" in 1643
- Yolanda Quijano is a Mexican painter and sculptor who lives in Cuernavaca.
- María Luisa Reid (born in 1943 in Zacatepec) is a Mexican sculptor.
- Eduardo del Río "Ruis" (1934–2017) was a cartoonist and writer born in Zamora, Michoacan and who lived in Las Palmas, Cuernavaca and in Tepoztlán.
- Diego Rivera (1886–1957) was a Mexican muralist. He lived in Acapantzingo, Cuernavaca from 1951 to 1957.
- John King Edward Spencer (b. U.K. 1928 - d. Cuernavaca 2005), best known for designing the stone/iron fence of the church of the Reyes Magos in Tetela del Monte, Cuernavaca. Upon his death he donated his home to the city of Cuernavaca as the Casona Spencer cultural center.
- Rufino Tamayo (1899–1991) was a Mexican painter. Calle 5 de Mayo, where he lived in Cuernavaca, was renamed in his honor after his death.
- Roger von Gunten (born 1933) was born in Zurich, Switzerland in 1933. In 1957 he traveled to Cuernavaca and became a Mexican citizen in 1980. He lives in Tepoztlan.

== Writers, educators, and journalists ==
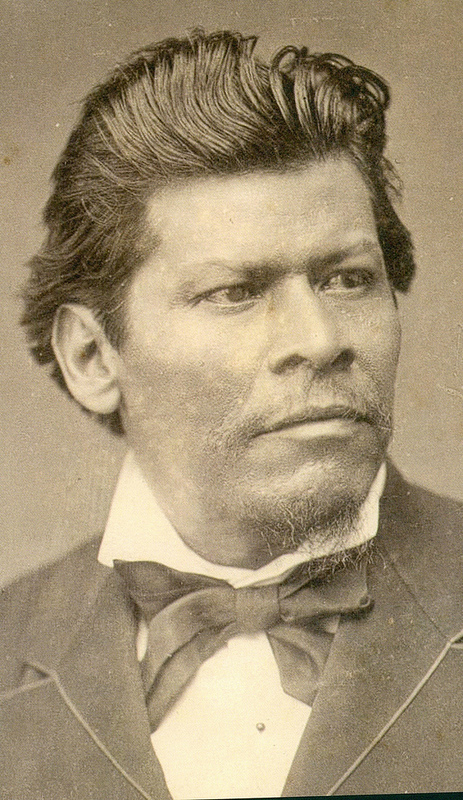
Ignacio Manuel Altamirano

- José Agustín (born 1944) is a Mexican writer who lives in Cuautla.
- Ignacio Manuel Altamirano (1834–1893). Author of El Zarco, set in Yautepec de Zaragoza between 1861 and 1863.
- Agustín Aragón León (1870–1954) was an educator who founded the Revista Positiva. He was born in Jonacatepec.
- Pedro Castera, 20th century novelist (Carmen), which takes place in Cuernavaca.
- María Isabel Cacalpotitla (?-1560), woman who taught Nahuatl to the Augustinians of Ocuituco.
- Lucio Carpanta, Nahutl teacher and author from Xoxocotla, Morelos
- Antonio Díaz Soto y Gama (1880–1967) was born in San Luis Potosí. He was an agrarian leader during the Mexican Revolution who supported the Plan de Ayala. He encouraged the establishment of schools in Jantetelco and Zacualpan de Amilpas.
- Isidro Fabela (1882–1964) was a writer, journalist, and diplomat who was born and died in Cuernavaca.
- Erich Fromm (1900–1980). Psychoanalyst and humanist who lived in Cuernavaca from 1956 to 1976.
- Joaquín García Icazbalceta (1824–1894) was a Mexican philologist and historian who published the newspaper La Voz de Morelos in defense of the state in 1873.
- Juan Antonio Lobato (18th century) writer from Tetecala, provincial leader of the Mercedarians.
- Miguel López de Nava (b. in Jonacatepec1858-1942), poet and musician
- Sergio Jimenez Bénitez, novelist from Xoxocotla, Morelos
- Malcolm Lowry (1909–1957) was an English writer who lived in the Casa de la Bola in Cuernavaca. He wrote Under the Volcano, a novel set in Quauhnahuac on the Day of the Dead in 1938.
- Juan Francisco Miranda (1720-1759), Jesuit writer born in Atlacomulco, died in Rome
- Celia Muñoz Escobar (b. in Cuernavaca 1912-1976), educator, poet, and writer. There is a street in Cuernavaca named after her.
- Helena Paz Garro (1939–2014), poet who was born in Mexico City, lived most of her life in Switzerland because of her participation in the student movement in 1968, and who died in Cuernavaca.
- Manuel Mazari Puerto (1891–1935) was born in Jojutla. He was a homeopathic doctor, writer, and historian (Bosquejo Histórico del Estado de Morelos).
- Gerardo Horacio Porcayo Villalobos (born 1966 in Cuernavaca), is a Mexican science fiction and fantasy writer. Porcayo's novel, La primera calle de la soledad (Solitude's First Road) is an example of the cyberpunk subgenre of science fiction.
- Musito Primo (b. in Jantetelco, 1839-?), Indigenous writer famous for a comedy.
- Alfonso Reyes (1889–1959) was a humanist and writer who lived in Cuernavaca, 1947–1959. He was nominated for the Nobel Prize in Literature five times.
- Armando Salgado, (1938-2018), photojournalist who captured the Corpus Christi massacre of 120 students in 1971.
- René Orta Salgado (ca. 1969 – May 13, 2012) was former Mexican journalist, lawyer, and political activist for the Institutional Revolutionary Party (PRI). He was killed in Cuernavaca during the election season of 2012; the murder could have been linked to his past in journalism and the Mexican drug war.
- Alma Karla Sandoval (born 1975) is a poet born in Zacatepec. She writes for La Jornada Morelos and works as a professor at the Instituto Tecnológico de Monterrey Morelos Campus.
- Arnulfo Soriano, an indigenous poet from Xoxocotla
- John Steinbeck (1902–1968) was an American writer. He visited Cuernavaca in 1945, where he was inspired to co-write the screenplay for Viva Zapata with Jack Wagner
- Gutierre Tibon (1905-1999) was an Italian-Mexican author who lived in Acapantzingo, Cuernavaca, from 1959 until his death at 93 in 1999.
- José Urbán Aguirre (b. Cuautla, January 13, 1888), elementary school teacher in eastern Morelos (1906-1930) and politician (1930-1958)
- Jules Verne (1828–1905) was a French writer who described Cuernavaca in his short story A Drama in Mexico (1851).

== Other ==
- Daniela Álvarez (born in Cuernavaca in 1993) is a Mexican beauty pageant titleholder who won the title at the "Nuestra Belleza Mexico" pageant in 2013. She represented Mexico at the Miss World 2014 beauty pageant held on December 14, 2014 in London.
- Chicomoyollotzin Pilliciuatzin, wife of Tlaltecatzin, tlatoani of Cuauhnáhuac.
- Chichimecacihuatzin I, wife of Moctezuma I, daughter of Cuauhtototzin
- Samir Flores Soberanes (1989 – February 19, 2019) was born in Amanalco, Temoac. He was a radio announcer and activist murdered in his hometown during the leadup to the referendum on construction of the thermoelectric plant in Huexca, Yecapixtla.
- The Jojutla crater was discovered on Mars in 2006 by astronomer Andres Eloy Martínez Rojas.
- Modesta Lavana Pérez (1929–2010) was an indigenous Nahua healer and activist from the town of Hueyapan. She was recognized as an important activist for indigenous rights and women's rights in Morelos, where she worked as a healer and as a legal translator of the Nahuatl language for the state of Morelos.
- Roberto Francisco Miranda Moreno (born 1955 in Morelos) is a Mexican General officer who served as the last chief of the Estado Mayor Presidencial (EMP), the institution charged with protecting and safeguarding the President of Mexico and the First Lady of Mexico. The institution was disbanded on December 1, 2018 by President Andrés Manuel López Obrador.
- Graciela Soto Cámara (born in Cuernavaca) is a model who represented Mexico in Miss International 1999 in Tokyo.

== See also ==
- Municipalities of Morelos
- Roman Catholic Diocese of Cuernavaca
- Anglican Church of Mexico
- Battle of Cuautla (1911)
- Plan of Cuernavaca
- Plan of Ayala
- Casino de la Selva
