= 1917 Mexican general election =

- 11 March 1917
- Presidential election
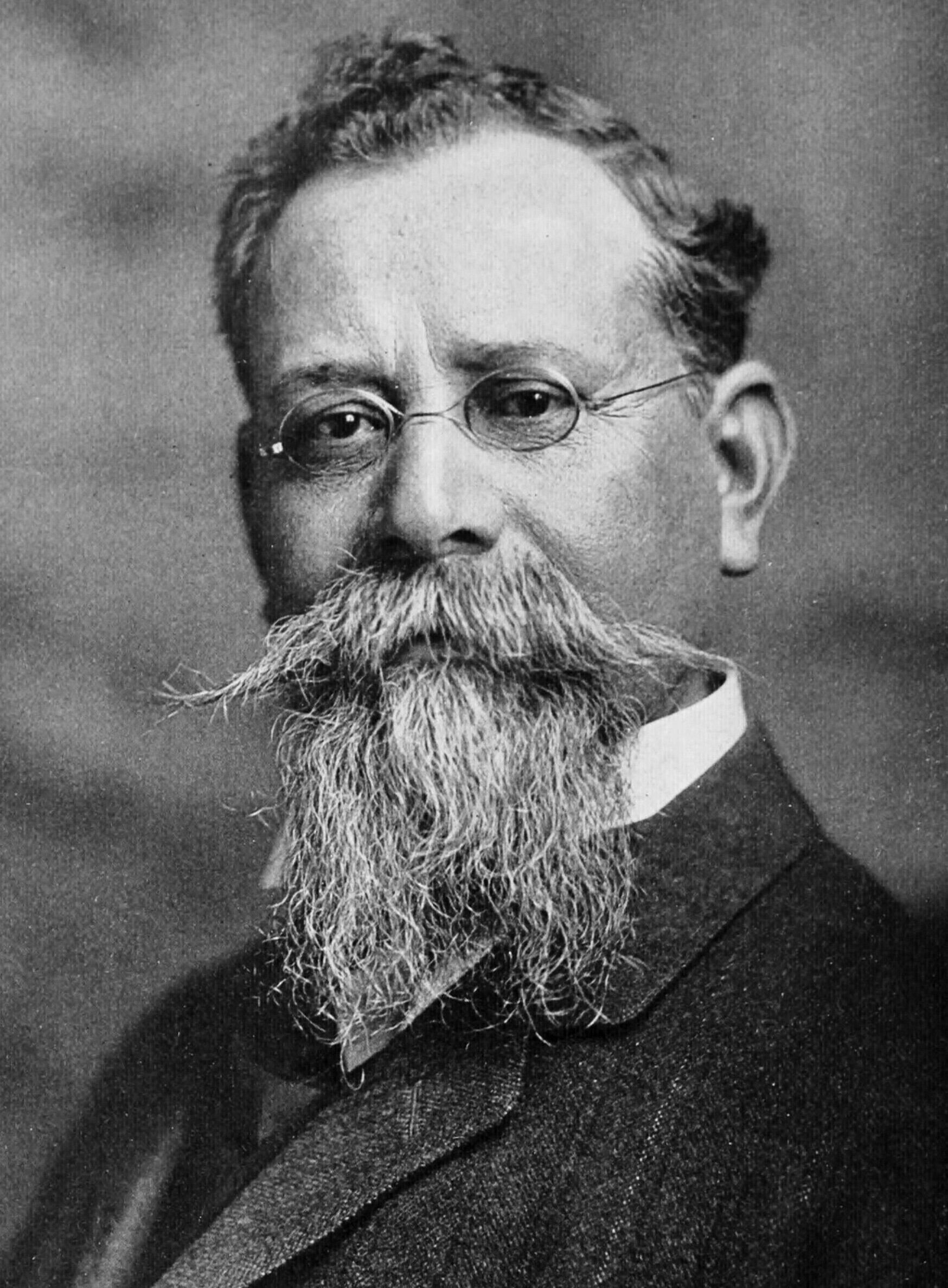

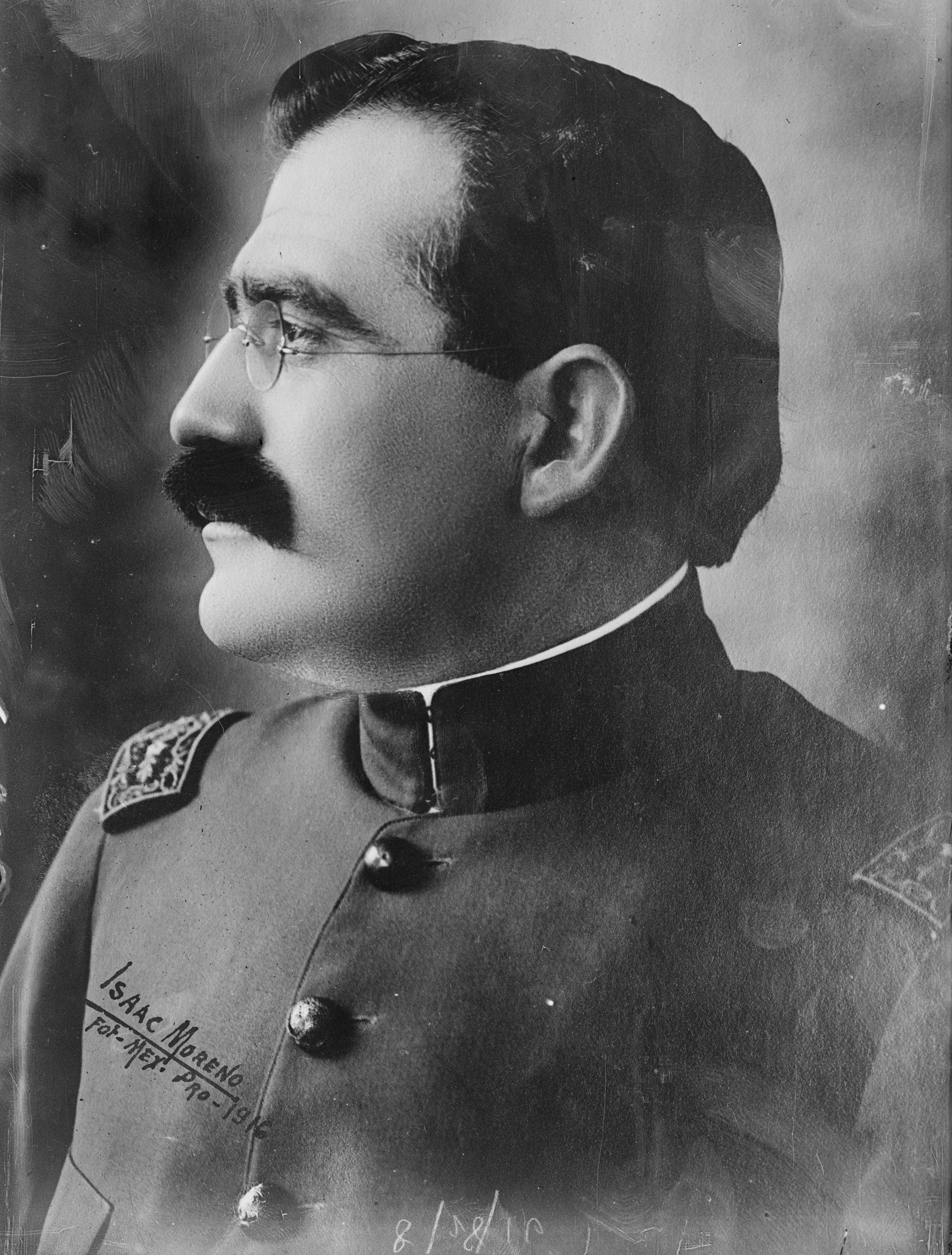
Nominee	Venustiano Carranza	Pablo González Garza
Party	Liberal Constitutionalist	Democratic League
Popular vote	797,305	11,615
Percentage	97.17%	1.42%
President before election
Position vacant
Venustiano Carranza as Head of the Executive Power
Elected President
Venustiano Carranza
Liberal Constitutionalist

General elections were held in Mexico on 11 March 1917. The presidential election resulted in an overwhelming victory for Venustiano Carranza of the Liberal Constitutionalist Party, who received 97% of the vote.

== Results ==
=== President ===
Candidate	Party	Votes	%
Venustiano Carranza	Liberal Constitutionalist Party	797,305	97.17
Pablo González Garza	The Democratic League	11,615	1.42
Álvaro Obregón	Independent	4,008	0.49
Other candidates		7,557	0.92
Total		820,485	100.00
Source: Ramírez Rancaño
