= Pablo Garza =

Pablo Garza may refer to:

- Pablo González Garza (1879–1950), Mexican general
- Pablo Garza (fighter) (born 1983), American mixed martial arts fighter
