= 6159 Andréseloy =

Main-belt asteroid

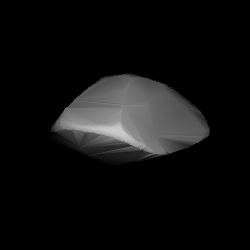
- Shape model of Roberts from its lightcurve

Discovery
- Discovered by: S. Ueda; H. Kaneda
- Discovery site: Kushiro Obs. (399)
- Discovery date: 30 December 1991

Designations
- Named after: Andrés Eloy Martínez (Mexican astronomer)
- Alternative designations: 1991 YH · 1987 UY_{4} 1990 OZ_{1} · 1990 SB_{17}
- Minor planet category: main-belt · Vesta

Orbital characteristics
- Epoch 4 September 2017 (JD 2458000.5)
- Uncertainty parameter 0
- Observation arc: 29.62 yr (10,819 days)
- Aphelion: 2.4341 AU
- Perihelion: 2.1482 AU
- Semi-major axis: 2.2912 AU
- Eccentricity: 0.0624
- Orbital period (sidereal): 3.47 yr (1,267 days)
- Mean anomaly: 173.81°
- Mean motion: 0° 17^{m} 3.12^{s} / day
- Inclination: 6.8577°
- Longitude of ascending node: 30.291°
- Argument of perihelion: 56.793°

Physical characteristics
- Mean diameter: 5.263±0.033 km
- Synodic rotation period: 10.639±0.005 h 10.6590±0.0005 h
- Pole ecliptic latitude: (266.0°, 67.0°) (λ_{1}/β_{1}); (62.0°, 67.0°) (λ_{2}/β_{2})
- Geometric albedo: 0.484±0.055
- Spectral type: S (assumed)
- Absolute magnitude (H): 12.8 · 13.5

6159 Andréseloy (prov. designation: 1991 YH) is a Vesta asteroid from the inner regions of the asteroid belt, approximately 5.3 kilometers (3.3 miles) in diameter. It was discovered on 30 December 1991, by Japanese astronomers Seiji Ueda and Hiroshi Kaneda at Kushiro Observatory (399) on the island of Hokkaido, Japan. It was named after Mexican astronomer Andrés Eloy Martínez.

== Orbit and classification ==
Andréseloy is an attributed member of the Vesta family, one of the largest collisional populations of stony asteroids in the asteroid belt. It orbits the Sun in the inner main-belt at a distance of 2.1–2.4 AU (semi-major axis of 2.29 AU) once every 3 years and 6 months (1,267 days). Its orbit has an eccentricity of 0.06 and an inclination of 7° with respect to the ecliptic. The asteroid was first observed as 1987 UY_{4} at Crimea–Nauchnij in 1987, extending the body's observation arc by 4 years prior to its official discovery observation at Kushiro.

== Naming ==
This minor planet was named in honor of Andrés Eloy Martínez, Mexican astronomer and citizen scientist. He is known in his country for the adaptation of the novel The War of the Worlds. He likes to create scientific videos for the Internet. His main concerns are global warming and the impact of an asteroid on Earth.

=== Contest ===
The name was suggested by the Urania Astronomical Society (Spanish: Sociedad Astronomica Urania) of Mexico. This society was a winner of the NameExoWorlds contest organised by International Astronomical Union (IAU) in 2015, and was also awarded the naming right for this asteroid. In total, the naming of 17 minor planets such as 6117 Brevardastro was granted as an award to the contest's winners. The official naming citation was approved by the IAU's Committee on Small Body Nomenclature and published by the Minor Planet Center on 12 February 2017 (M.P.C. 103029).

== Physical characteristics ==
Andréseloy has been characterized as a common S-type asteroid.

=== Rotation and poles ===
In March 2006, a rotational lightcurve of Andréseloy was obtained from photometric observations by American astronomer Brian Warner at this Palmer Divide Observatory (716), Colorado. Lightcurve analysis gave an average rotation period of 10.639 hours with a brightness variation of 0.78 magnitude (U=3). Such a high brightness amplitude typically indicates that the body has a non-spheroidal shape.

=== Poles ===
In 2013, an international study modeled a lightcurve with a concurring period of 10.6590 hours and found a spin axis of (266.0°, 67.0°) and (62.0°, 67.0°) in ecliptic coordinates (λ, β) (Q=2).

=== Diameter and albedo ===
According to the survey carried out by NASA's Wide-field Infrared Survey Explorer with its subsequent NEOWISE mission, Andréseloy measures 5.263 kilometers in diameter and its surface has a high albedo of 0.484. The Collaborative Asteroid Lightcurve Link assumes an albedo of 0.24 – derived from 8 Flora, the largest member and namesake of its family – and calculates a diameter of 5.41 kilometers with an absolute magnitude of 13.5.
