= Acapantzingo =

Barrio in Morelos, Mexico

Coordinates: 18.9°N 99.217°W

Acapantzingo (Spanish: [a ka pan ˈzɪn go]) is a barrio (borough or neighborhood) in the southeastern part of the City of Cuernavaca, Morelos, Mexico, 2 km from the city center. The Nahuatl name means on the slope of the reeds (acatl: reed; pan: on; tzinco or tzintla: slope). It is bound by the Río Chalchihuapan on the west, Colonia Atlacumulco, Jiutepec to the east and south, Colonia Palmira to the south, and Calle Cuauhatemoc (Colonia Amatitlán, Fracc. Jacarandas, Fracc. Las Quintas) to the north.

Acapantzingo is divided into different colonias (neighborhoods) and fraccionamientos (subdivisions), including: Colonia San Miguel Acapantzingo, Ejido de Acapantzingo, Fracc. Jacarandas, Fracc. Jardines de Acapantzingo, Fracc. Los Cisos, Pueblo de Acapantzingo, and Tabachines.

== History ==
=== Prehispanic history ===
There are indications that the origins of Acapantzingo date to 1500 BCE, since early agricultural settlements are similar to those in Zacatenco (700-400 BCE) and Tucumán (400-200 BCE). Some historical antecedents indicate that the Tlahuica ceremonial center known Teopanzolco belonged to the town of Acapantzingo.

=== Conquest and colonialism ===
Hernán Cortés arrived in Cuauhnáhuac (modern Cuernavaca) on April 13, 1521; after a brief battle where he sacked and burned the city, he retired to the beautiful garden of Acapantzingo, where the cacique (warlord) Yoatzin lived. Yoatzin pledged obedience to Cortes, who spent the night there. The following morning was a Sunday, so Fray Pedro Melgarejo de Urrea celebrated what was to be the first mass in Cuernavaca before setting off to rape and pillage Xochimilco.

Cortés returned to Acapantzingo in 1524 while he built the Palace of Cortes. Acapantzingo was considered part of the Marquesado del Valle de Oaxaca property of Hérnan Cortés and his descendants until 1869 when it was integrated into the municipality of Cuernavaca after the erection of the State of Morelos. The town of Acapantzingo was one of the four main boroughs that formed the city during the colonial period. Its patron saint was originally San Diego de Alcalá and later San Miguel Arcángel. Some sources say San Miguel was built in the 16th century; however, according to chronologist Juan Dubernard, the statue of St. Michael the Archangel found in the interior of the church was brought from San Miguel de Chapultepec (today called San Juan Evangelista) on May 8, 1743.

=== 19th century ===
Maximilian I of Mexico arrived in Mexico in 1861 and declared himself emperor in 1864. He bought the Borda Garden in downtown Cuernavaca as a vacation home and took the daughter of his gardener La India Bonita, as his mistress. He purchased a finca (estate) for her in front of the Church of San Miguel Acapantzingo; calling it El Olido in membrance of the lovers created by Italian poet Torquato Tasso: Olindo and Safronia. The townspeople of Acapantzingo soon called it, El Olvido, suggesting he went there to forget his crazy wife, Carlota. Today it is the Jardín Etnobotánico en Cuernavaca. (Max didn't completely forget Carlota; he named the bridge across the Río Chalchihuapan "La Emperatriz.")

In 1876, Governor Carlos Pacheco established the first Regional School on the Acapantzingo estate of the former emperor. In 1923 the Secretary of Agriculture converted this to an experimental farm, and it 1976 it became a botanical garden under the direction of the Instituto Nacional de Antropología e Historia (National Institute of Anthropology and History, INAH).

=== 20th century ===
In 1914, during the Mexican Revolution, the bridge built on Calle 5 de Mayo (today called Calle Rufino Tamayo) was destroyed to keep the Zapatistas out of the city; it was rebuilt in 1927 and widened in 1999. The revolutionaries for their part sacked and destroyed the chapel of San Diego Alcalá (affectionately called San Diegito) on Galeana Street; the chapel was rebuilt in 1943.

The Ejido de Acapantzingo, consisting of 396 hectares (980 acres), was created on January 17, 1925. Juan B. Carral bought 142 hectares (350 acres) of this land in exchange for land in the state of San Luis Potosí. After Carral's death, 100 hectares (250 acres) were sold to Mauricio Urdaneta for the construction of the Tabachines subdivision and the golf club located there. Other lands were sold to Luis Paganoni to construct the subdivisions Jardines de Acapantzingo and Los Cisnos.

During the 1980s a dispute between followers of Traditionalist Catholicism and mainline Roman Catholics led to the construction of the Church of the Virgen de Guadalupe on Ruíz Cortinez Street in Colonia San Miguel Acapantzingo. The priest responsible for this construction, Fr. Juan Guerrero (d. 2021) also built chapels in Jardines de Acapantzingo (Espiritu Santo or "Holy Spirit"), Tabachines, and the Ejido (San Isidro Labrador). In 1990 the traditionalists were expulsed from the churches of San Miguel and San Diegito, and they built the church of La Divina Providencia (or "Divine Providence") on Calle 16 de Septiembre.

In 1994, the office of Secretary of Development of the Environment (SEDAM) proposed seizing 270 hectares (670 acres) of land from the Ejido de Acapantzingo to make an Ecological Park. The ejidatarios resisted, and in the year 2000 the Parque Ecológico San Miguel Acapantzingo opened on the site of the former state penitentiary in the Jacarandas subdivision, on the north side of Av. Atlacomulco.

=== 21st century ===
On May 22, 2020, during the COVID-19 pandemic in Mexico, 17 confirmed cases of the virus were reported in Acapantzingo, fourth highest in the municipality. Also in 2020, the National Guard was sent to patrol the streets of Acapantzingo at the request of Gerardo Abarca Peña, ayundante municipal. Acapantzingo was included in the list of colonias with high infection rates during the COVID-19 pandemic in Mexico in December 2020.

== Points of interest and activities ==
The chapel of San Diego Alcalá was probably built by Franciscans in the 16th century. Located on Calle Galeana (formerly Calle San Diego), it was burned and sacked during the Mexican Revolution and rebuilt in 1943. It has an atrium surrounded by a short wall topped with inverted arches; the façade has hollow arches for three bells with a cross above. The Feast of San Diegito is celebrated with a fair including Chinelos, a brass band, and fireworks, on November 13.

The 18th-century parish church San Miguel Arcángel is located on Calle Matamoros. Its entrance has a semicircular arch and a flower can be seen in relief. Above the entrance, there is a small gable. On the left side of the façade there is a two-level tower with a pinnacle in each of its angles and a cupola. The church of San Miguel has a single nave, with a barrel vault running through it and a skylight on top. There is a neoclassical altar with a stucco statue of St. Michael, and there is a choir loft. The sacristy is on the north side. The atrium has several large plum trees for shade, and there is an outside chapel built in the 2010s. The feast of San Miguel is celebrated with a fair including mechanical rides, a brass band, Chinelos, and fireworks on September 29.

The church of San Miguel is built along a cobblestone street. There is a large cross located on the southeast corner of Calles Matamoros and Arteaga. Across from the church is the country estate El Olvido built by Emperor Maximilian I in 1865. The farm was named El Olindo in memory of the lovers created by the Italian poet Torquato Tasso: Olindo and Sophrania: A Tragedy (1758). It is frequently called la Casa de la India Bonita and today it houses the Jardín Etnobotánico y Museo de la Medicina Tradicional, which opened in 1979. A wide variety of medicinal plants, cacti, condiments, and ornamental plants such as orchids can be seen. The visitor will find a permanent exhibition on the historical background of the species that are reported in 16th-century codices as well as current studies on traditional medicine.

The Ecological Park San Miguel Acapantzingo is built in what was the Atlacomulco Penitentiary (1935–2000). It has green areas with a playground, a jogging track, and the Science Museum. One of the original prison cells still stands, and there is a traditional Cuexcomate (adobe and straw silo), a Byzantine-style mural titled Despertar en Primavera (Waking in Spring) by Yolanda Iñiguez, and a dancing fountain accompanied by a light show and music. Located at Ave. Atlacomulco 136, Acapatzingo.

The Cuernavaca Spring Fair is celebrated in the Ejido de Acapantzingo during Holy Week. The fair features mechanical rides, internationally known musicians, cockfights, handicrafts, and food from every corner of Mexico. The fair was canceled in 2018 due to concerns about crime.

For recreation, one can visit the Golf Club in Tabachines or the Unidad Deportiva Chato Balderas de Acapantzingo (soccer field) on Calle Galeana.

The Sección Cuauhnahuac of the Asociación Mexicana de Orquideología (Mexican Orchid Association) holds an annual exhibition around the Day of the Dead (November 2). In recent years, this has been held at the Universidad Guizar y Valencia, Av. Atlacomulco s/n esq, Calle Morelos.

== Schools and education ==
There are seven early learning centers (CENDI) and preschools (Prescolar); two are public) in Acapantzingo. There are nine primarias (elementary schools, grades 1–6); two are full-time public schools. There are six secundarias (middle school, grades 7–9); one is public. There are three private preparatorias (high schools, grades 10–12) and five institutions of higher education:

- Centro de Actualización del Magisterio Cuernavaca (public), Calle Narciso Mendoza #9 (for teacher training),
- Colegio Estatal de Seguridad Publica (public), Narciso Mendoza #47 (police academy),
- Encuentros Comunicacion y Cultura (private), Calle Jose Maria Morelos #36 (engineering),
- Universidad Americana de Morelos (private), Calle del Ejido #30, Colonia Ejido de Acapantzingo (university), and
- Universidad Guizar y Valencia (private), Calle Morelos s/n esq. Atlacumolco (university).

== People from Acapantzingo ==
The best-known residents of Acapantzingo are Emperor Maximilian and Concepcion Sedano, his mistress. There is a plaque on the outside of the house located at the corner of Calle Morelos and Calle Rufino Tamayo that states, Casa de Diego Rivera 1951-1957. Artist Rufino Tamayo (1899–1991) had a home on the same street, formerly called Cinco de Mayo. Princess Maria Beatrice of Savoy (b. Italy, 1943) lived with her family on Calle Matamoros from 1971 until her husband's murder in 1999. Gutierre Tibón, an Italian-Mexican writer, lived in Acapantzingo for 40 years; Cristina Cassy, a classic and impressionist painter and Rodolfo Becerril Straffon (b. Cuernavaca, 1943), writer, journalist, former federal deputy (PRI, 1991–1994), and one-time candidate for governor; live in Acapantzingo. The Yucateco composer, Armando Manzanero, had a vacation home on Calle 16 de Septiembre.

== See also ==
- Cuernavaca
- Cuernavaca Municipality
- List of people from Morelos
