= Pablo González Garza =

Mexican army general and politician (1879–1950)

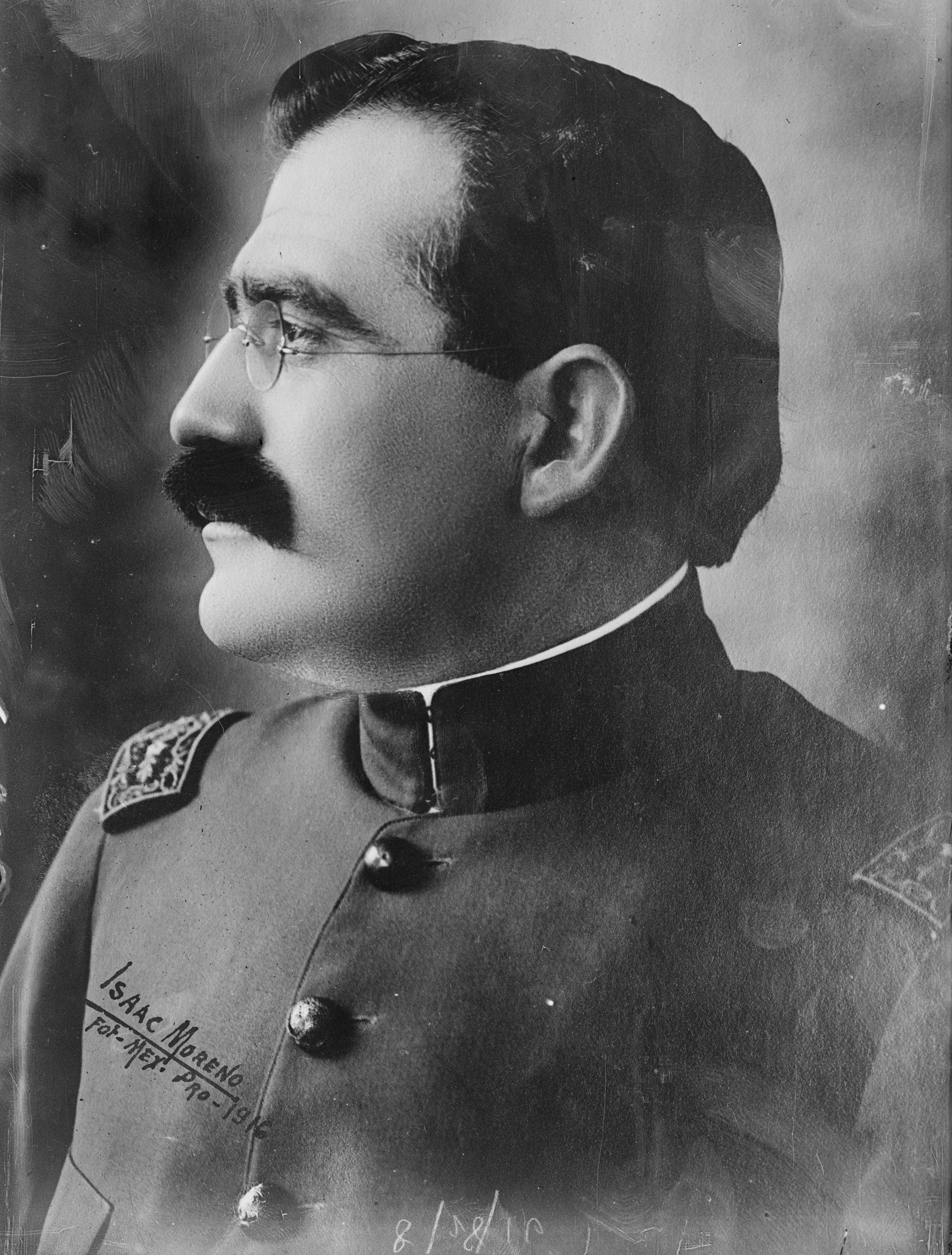
- Born: 5 May 1879; Lampazos de Naranjo, Nuevo León, Mexico
- Died: 4 March 1950 (aged 70); Monterrey, Nuevo León, Mexico
- Military career
- Allegiance: Mexico
- Branch: Maderistas (1911–1912); Mexican Army (1912–1913, 1914–1920); Constitutional Army (1913–1914)
- Service years: 1911–1920
- Rank: General
- Commands: Northeastern Corps (1913–1914)
- Conflicts: Mexican Revolution

Pablo González Garza (May 5, 1879 – March 4, 1950) was a general during the Mexican Revolution. He is considered to be the main organizer of the assassination of Emiliano Zapata.

== Early life ==
Born in Lampazos de Naranjo, Nuevo León, Pablo González grew up in the town of Nadadores, Coahuila, where his parents owned a store. He was orphaned at six years old. Eventually, he received a scholarship to the Military Academy in Chapultepec but decided not finish his studies. In the early years of the twentieth century he worked in a foundry, on the railroad and for an oil company, in various places in northern Mexico and the southern United States.

== Early part of Mexican Revolution ==
In 1907, through his cousin, he met the anarchist Enrique Flores Magón. González participated in Francisco Madero's insurrection against President Porfirio Díaz in 1911. His forces occupied Monclova and Cuatro Ciénegas for Madero. Subsequently, in 1912, he fought against the rebellion of Pascual Orozco. Later, after Victoriano Huerta's coup d'état against Madero, González fought against Huerta and Orozco in Coahuila. While at the time González was considered a rising military star, Orozco beat him in every encounter, which contributed to González eventually becoming known as "the general who never won a victory". This ill reputation followed him in subsequent years. In a later interview with Vicente Blasco Ibáñez, Carranza stated that "General González commanded the largest forces in the Revolution and he came out of it with the unique honor of having lost every battle in which he was engaged".

== Under Carranza ==
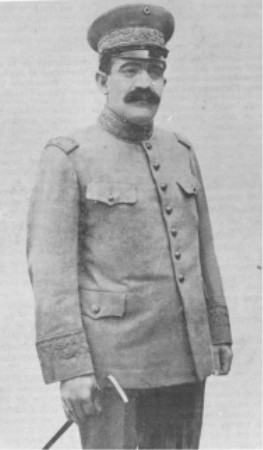
Pablo González in 1914

Later on he was appointed chief of the Army of the Northeast in the government of Venustiano Carranza and in 1914 occupied Monterrey, Tampico and other places for him. González's occupation of Monterrey, along with the Battle of Zacatecas, was crucial in Huerta's defeat and subsequent decision to go into exile. At the same time, Álvaro Obregón was appointed to lead the Army of the Northwest, which was a position equivalent to that of González. Since Obregón viewed González as an incompetent general, this contributed to his resentment of Carranza which bore fruit later.

On 29 November 1914, he briefly proclaimed himself President against Carranza and the acclaimed President Eulalio Gutiérrez.

== Against the Zapatistas ==
He was also in charge of pacification of the Zapatista rebellion in Morelos during the fighting between Emiliano Zapata and Carranza, where he earned a reputation for brutality and ruthlessness. González's manifesto of July 19, 1916, explicitly stated that Morelos civilians, including women and children, who were perceived as supporters of Zapata, were going to be massacred (though officially counted among those who died in battle). In his pacification campaigns, González reinstitute the practice of Victoriano Huerta and Porfirio Diaz of shipping captured peasants to Yucatán for heavy forced labor. To combat González, Zapata provided arms to individual villages, even those not directly under his control, so they could form effective self-defense units. This policy eventually backfired on Zapata since after González left, villagers used the weapons against Zapatista foraging parties, which in turn led to numerous conflicts between the peasants and rebels.

González was mostly successful in suppressing the rebellion in Morelos for a time, due to help from a turncoat Zapatista general, Sidronio Camacho (who had killed Zapata's brother, Eufemio Zapata), who provided him with crucial intelligence. After another revolt in Coahuila, led by Lucio Blanco, González was recalled. Zapata then reclaimed his home state.

== Assassination of Zapata ==
He was the mastermind behind the assassination of Emiliano Zapata, which was carried out by his Colonel, Jesús Guajardo. In early 1919 disagreements arose between González and Guajardo, and after learning of these, Zapata wrote a letter to Guajardo, asking him to join the Zapatistas. The letter was intercepted by González who blackmailed Guajardo and used it as an opportunity to set up an ambush for Zapata. After making a show of loyalty to Zapata by executing a turncoat Zapatista chief, Victoriano Bárcena, Guajardo arranged a meeting with Zapata at Chinameca Hacienda at which he was supposed to deliver badly needed ammunitions. After Zapata arrived, on April 10, 1919, a guard of honor presented arms to him, but on the third signal of the bugle they opened up fire at point blank range, killing Zapata.

== Break with Carranza ==
In the election of 1920, President Carranza promoted the civilian Ignacio Bonillas as his successor, to the great displeasure of his generals, particularly Álvaro Obregón, who wanted the presidency for himself. After Carranza attempted to arrest him, Obregón led a military revolt.

Initially González remained loyal to Carranza. However, most officers in his army supported Obregón, and his ally, Plutarco Elías Calles and vehemently opposed Bonillas. As a result, Gonzalez declared his own candidacy for the presidency.

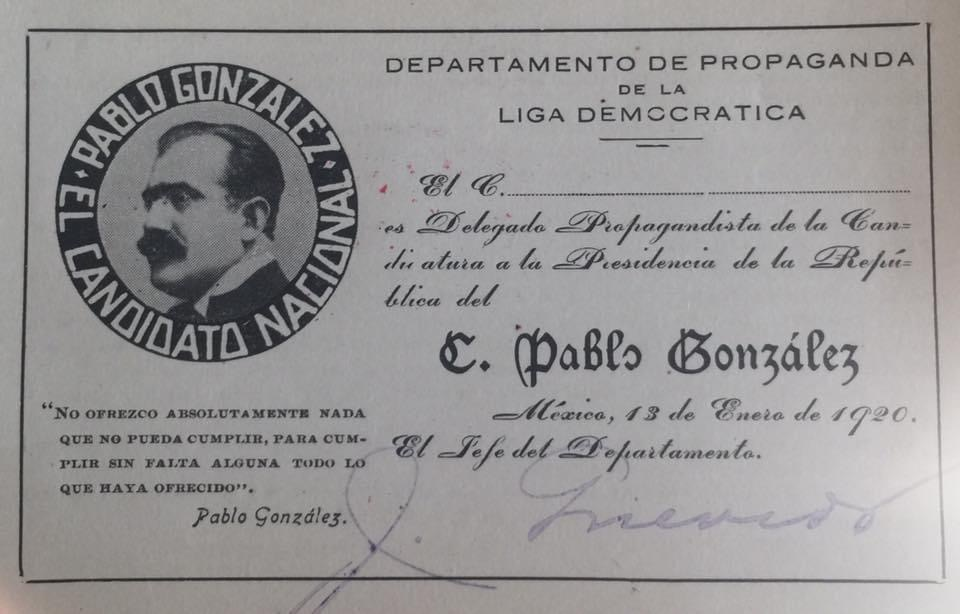

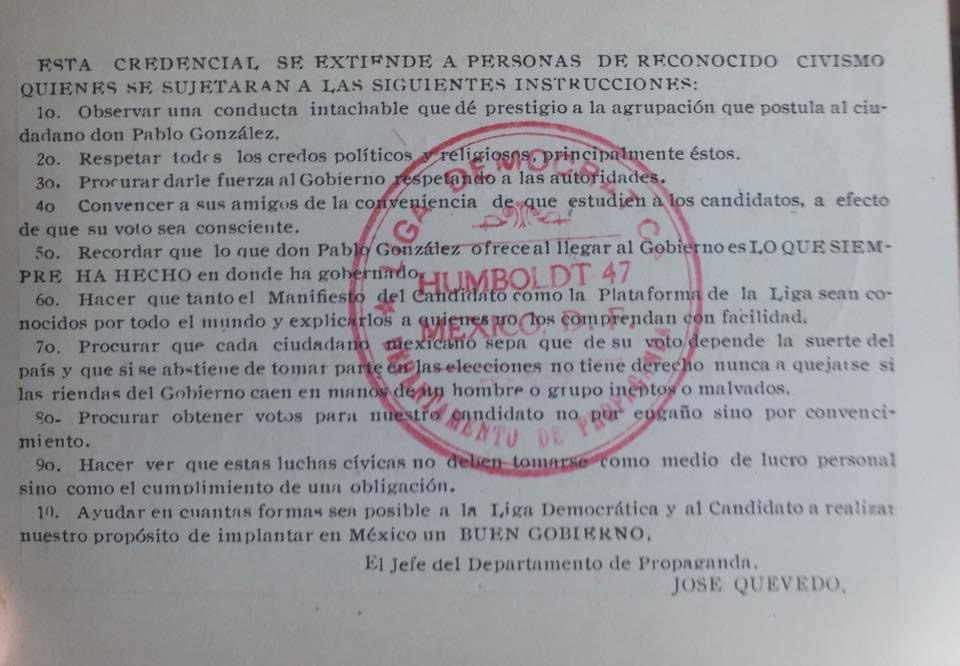

In April 1920, Carranza demanded that González drop his election bid and give his full support to Bonillas. On April 30, González officially broke with Carranza, although instead of arresting him and immediately occupying Mexico City (most of the troops in the region supported him), he allowed Carranza to escape to Veracruz and he himself withdrew to nearby Texcoco.

During the interim presidency of Adolfo de la Huerta, González was accused of treason and sedition and arrested. He was initially sentenced to be executed, but was pardoned and instead went into exile in the US.

== Later life ==
After Obregón's victory over Carranza and then presidency, González returned to Mexico. He retired from active duty and politics and went into business. He was left almost destitute by the collapse of his bank, and died in 1950 in the city of Monterrey.
