= Sidronio Camacho =

Sidronio Camacho was one of the soldiers of Emiliano Zapata during the Mexican Revolution and the killer of Emiliano's brother, Eufemio.

On June 18, 1917, Camacho killed Emiliano's brother, Eufemio Zapata, who had beaten up Camacho's father, at the time Eufemio's second in command, supposedly for drunkenness (according to some sources, it was Eufemio who was drunk, not Sidronio's father), at Cuautla, Mexico. Sidronio avenged his father by shooting Eufemio in the abdomen. He then threw his still-living victim on an anthill. This event earned him the nickname "el loco Sidronio" ("the crazy Sidronio").

Knowing Emiliano would want to avenge his brother, Sidronio sought out sanctuary with Zapata's enemies, the Carrancistas (followers of Venustiano Carranza), who granted him an amnesty.

== See also ==
- Emiliano Zapata
- Eufemio Zapata
- Pancho Villa
- List of people from Morelos
