= Jacobo Grinberg =

Mexican pseudoscientist, neurophysiologist and psychologist

Jacobo Grinberg Zylberbaum (born Mexico City in 1946) was a Mexican neurophysiologist and psychologist. He studied Mexican shamanism, Eastern disciplines, meditation, astrology and telepathy through the scientific method. He wrote more than fifty books about these subjects. Grinberg disappeared in December 1994.

== Biography ==
Jacobo Grinberg Zylberbaum was born in Mexico City in 1946. Grinberg decided to study the human mind when he was 12 years old, after his mother died from a brain tumor. He studied psychology at the Faculty of Psychology of UNAM. In 1970, he went to New York City to study psychophysiology at the Brain Research Institute. He earned a Ph.D. at the E. Roy John Laboratory. His doctoral research focused on the electrophysiological effects of geometric stimuli on the human brain.

When he went back to Mexico, he founded a laboratory of psychophysiology at the Universidad Anáhuac. He installed another laboratory of this kind in UNAM in the late 1970s. He founded the Instituto Nacional para el Estudio de la Conciencia (INPEC) in 1987, financed by UNAM and CONACYT. Jacobo published several of his books through INPEC. Grinberg wrote more than 50 books about brain activity, witchcraft, shamanism, telepathy, and meditation.

Grinberg put his reputation as a scientist in danger when he tried to use the scientific method in shamanism studies. He combined the two in his professional work, always trying to understand the “magic world”. Grinberg attempted to change the way that the relationship between science and consciousness is understood. His work was rejected by fellow scientists as "psi assumption", the premise that any deviation from chance represents a case of telepathy.

== Disappearance ==
Jacobo Grinberg has been missing since December 8, 1994. On December 12, his family prepared a party for him to celebrate his 48th birthday, but he did not show up. It was common for him to make spontaneous travels or just not answer his phone for days, which is why his disappearance did not seem odd to his family in the beginning. On social media it was suggested that Jacobo Grinberg and Shiva Shambho were the same person. Grinberg's brother, Ari Telch, discarded the suggestion as ignorant and stupid.

== The sintergy theory ==
Grinberg's syntergy theory posits the existence of a continuous energy field, of which human beings perceive only a limited portion. This perceptual process gives rise to the experience commonly understood as reality. This theory tries to answer the question of the creation of the experience. The book where it is mentioned, El Cerebro Consciente, was translated into seven languages.

== In popular culture ==
In 2020, Netflix launched The Secret of Doctor Grinberg, a documentary about the disappearance of Dr. Grinberg.

== See also ==
- List of people who disappeared mysteriously: post-1970
- List of people from Morelos
- Undone (TV series), series exploring a fictional account of Jacobo's disappearance
