= Gerardo Horacio Porcayo =

Mexican writer

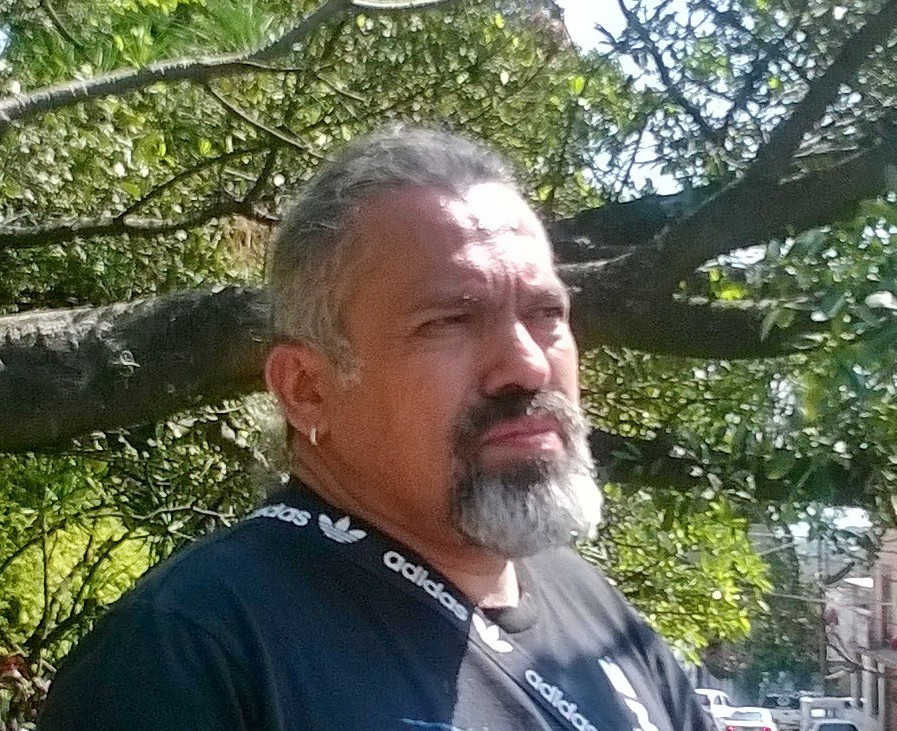
Gerardo Horacio Porcayo en febrero de 2015

Gerardo Horacio Porcayo Villalobos (born May 10, 1966 in Cuernavaca, Morelos, Mexico) is a Mexican science fiction and fantasy writer. Porcayo's novel, La primera calle de la soledad (Solitude's First Road) is considered to be the first example of the cyberpunk subgenre of science fiction in Iberoamerican literature. He currently works at the Universidad Iberoamericana Puebla.

== See also ==
- List of people from Morelos
