= Jorge Carrillo Olea =

Mexican politician and general (born 1937)

Governor of Morelos
- In office October 1, 1994 – May 15, 1998
- Preceded by: Antonio Riva Palacio
- Succeeded by: Jorge Morales Barud

Personal details
- Born: Jorge Carrillo Olea; 19 November 1937 (age 88) Jojutla, Morelos, Mexico
- Party: Institutional Revolutionary Party (PRI)
- Spouse: Hilda Enriquez Andrade
- Education: Bachelor in military administration from the Escuela Superior de Guerra
- Profession: Politician, general, journalist

Jorge Carrillo Olea (born in Jojutla, Morelos, on November 19, 1937) is a Mexican politician and general, and a member of Institutional Revolutionary Party, PRI. He served as governor of Morelos from October 1, 1994, to May 15, 1998.

== Early military education and career ==
Carrillo graduated with a degree in Military Administration from the Escuela Superior de Guerra. He served as undersecretary in the Secretaries of Finance and Public Credit (1976) and of the Interior (1983-1988). During the presidency of Carlos Salinas de Gortari (1988-1994) he founded the Center for Investigation and National Security (CISEN) and headed the Commission for Attention to Crimes against Health of the Attorney General's Office (PGR). During Miguel de la Madrid he led the dismantling of the repressive arm of the government, the Federal Security Directorate (DFS) and allowed a new perspective of Human Rights. for new political parties. He oversaw foreign intelligence services and DEA agents in Mexico at critical times in US-Mexico relations. [2]

== Public activities ==
He served in troop bodies in the states of Oaxaca, Veracruz, professor at the Heroico Colegio Militar and Escuela Superior de Guerra from 1959 to 1970. Chief of the Second Section (Intelligence) of the Presidential General Staff from 1970 to 1976.

During the six-year term chaired by the LIC. José López Portillo carried out the restructuring of the shipbuilding industry in the country. The Astilleros Unidos de Veracruz and Astilleros Unidos del Pacífico were built, of which he was counselor between 1977 and 1982. He was also a director of the National Fishing and Port Bank in 1977, as well as technical secretary of the National Coordinating Commission of the Naval Industry in 1978.

He was secretary of the Mexican Commission for Refugee Assistance (COMAR) from 1983 to 1998, after the crisis caused by an attack by Guatemalan paramilitary forces on a refugee camp located in national territory. This incident caused, in addition to a diplomatic conflict with Guatemala, the displacement of 40,000 Mayan indigenous people who were given legal and physical security in territory belonging to the states of Campeche and Quintana Roo.

Founder and first director of the Center for Investigation and National Security (CISEN) from 1988 to 1991 and General Coordinator for the Attention and Fight against Drug Trafficking in the Office of the Attorney General of the Republic (PGR) from 1991 to 1993. It is during this period that gives the capture of Joaquín Guzmán Loera, "El Chapo".

During his stay at the PGR, he promoted the redefinition of the anti-drug policy of the Mexican Government. During his assignment there was a comprehensive, multidisciplinary and open approach to international cooperation within which the relationship with the United States, Colombia, Central America and other Latin American countries was redefined. He was advisor to the President of the Republic for International Affairs Related to Drug Control before the UN in 1993.

== National Security and Intelligence Services ==
Under his leadership, Mexican intelligence services and national security shifted into modern institutions which relied on professionalism and specialization of its legal mandate, thus giving origin to an incipient intelligence community in the country and a solid cooperation with international services as well. He was and critical figure in the dismantlement of the repressive state which previously exceeded its functions.

A first generation of professional public servants under his lead eventually took over the new intelligence establishment and set forth a national effort which presently shows distortions and misconceptions of what a National Intelligence Directorate show be.

He was decorated by the governments of France, Germany, Yugoslavia, Jordan, Egypt, Italy, Spain, Austria, Romania, Venezuela, Senegal, Argentina, Japan and Great Britain.

== Governor of Morelos ==
In 1994 Carrillo was elected Governor of Morelos. Three years later, in 1997, within a security crisis in the state, as the kidnapping rate increased, he was the subject of political pressure to resign in the face of growing pressure from the federal government and his relations with the president of the republic soured for political reasons. interests at stake. This ultimately led to his resignation and after media pressure when the local congress initially impeached him for administrative decisions made in the previous term that were distorted to fit the general consensus generated by the media and for which evidence was never presented. For his part, Carrillo Olea has always proclaimed his innocence and nothing has ever been proven; He insisted that the complaints were invented by Graco Ramírez, the Bishop of Cuernavaca, Luis Reynoso Cervantes, and President Ernesto Zedillo.

== Rehabilitation and later career ==
Jorge Carrillo Oleo was exonerated by Judge María del Rosario Rojas Lara on February 16, 2003. He became a writer for La Jornada newspaper and Proceso magazine, both in Mexico City, specializing in security affairs.

In 2011, Carrillo Olea wrote México en Riesgo, Una visión personal sobre un Estado a la defensiva (Mexico at Risk, A Personal View of a State on the Defense), which is a reflection on the Mexican security apparatus during the presidencies of Luis Echeverría, José López Portillo, Miguel de la Madrid and Carlos Salinas de Gortari; as well events such as the Tlatelolco massacre of October 2, 1968, the 1973 Chilean coup d'état, the 1985 Mexico City earthquake, the collapse of the computer system during the 1988 Mexican election, and his own governorship of Morelos.

In 2018, Carrillo Olea wrote Torpezas de la inteligencia: Las grandes fallas dela seguridad nacional y sus posibles soluciones. President-elect Andrés Manuel López Obrador invited Jorge Carrillo Olea to collaborate with his government on security issues in 2018, but Carrillo turned him down, citing age.

== See also ==
- List of people from Morelos
- Presidents of Mexico

== Bibliography ==
- México en Riesgo, Una visión personal sobre un Estado a la defensiva Author: Jorge Carrillo Olea. Mexico City: Grijalbo. (2011). ISBN 978-6073105323
- Inteligencia Estratégica para Todos Author: Jorge Carrillo Olea. Mexico City: Del Castillo de Piedra. (2015)
- Historia Verdadera de la Conquista de Granada Author: Jorge Carrillo Olea. Mexico City: Luzam. (2017)
- Perspectivas para la Seguridad Pública Author: Jorge Carrillo Olea. Mexico City: Luzam. (2018)
- Torpezas de la Inteligencia Author: Jorge Carrillo Olea. Mexico City: Proceso. (2018)
- Sobre la Seguridad Editado por El Colegio de México. (2022)
