= Jojutla =

Municipality in Morelos, Mexico

Municipality of Jojutla
- Municipality
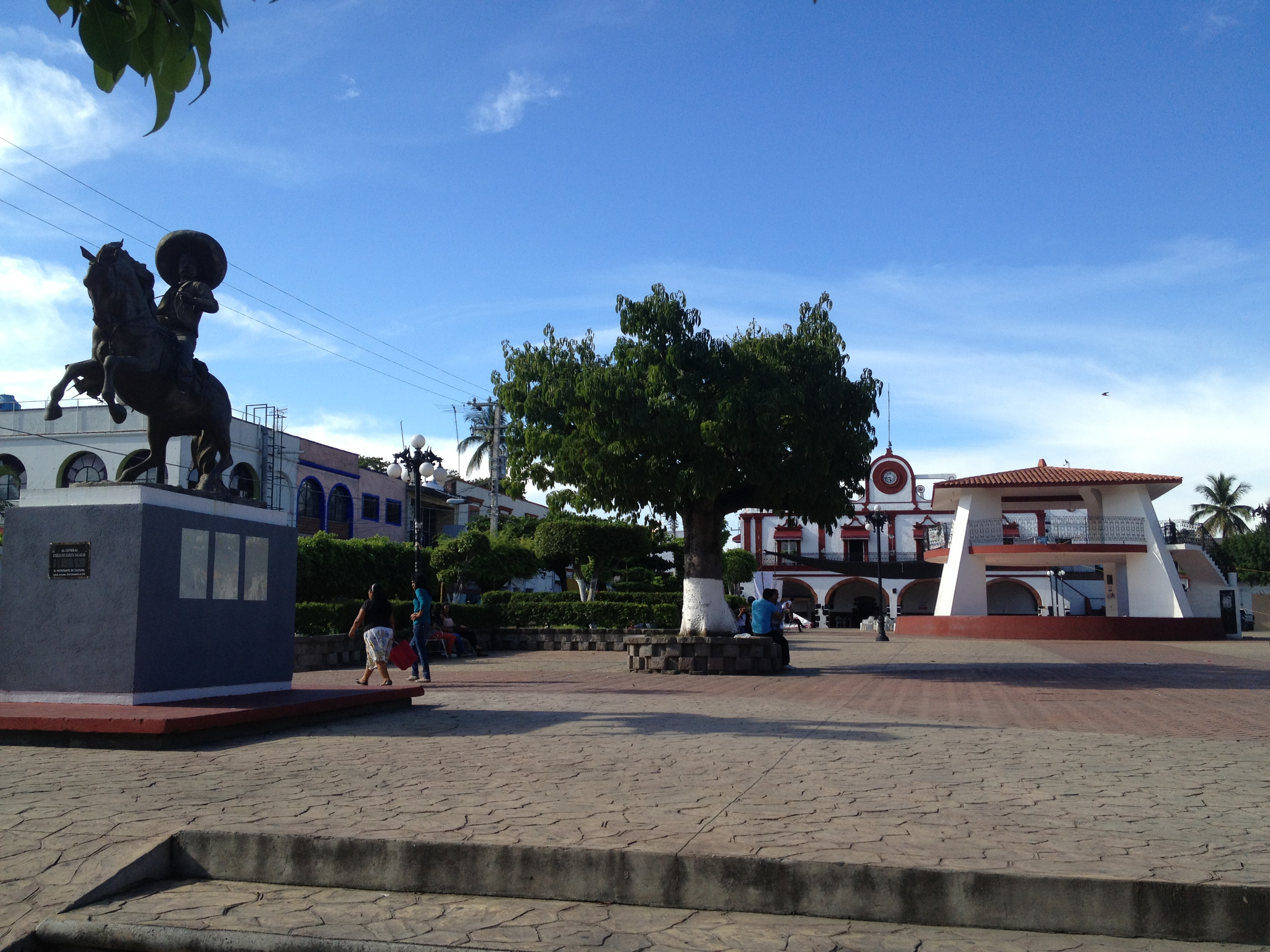
- Sovereign Revolutionary Convention Plaza

- Coat of arms
- Interactive map of Municipality of Jojutla
- Country: Mexico
- State: Morelos
- First settled: March 29,1847

Government
  - Municipal President: Alan Francisco Martínez García (2024-2027)

Area
  - Total: 149 km^{2} (58 sq mi)
- Highest elevation: 1,600 m (5,200 ft)
- Lowest elevation: 700 m (2,300 ft)

Population (2020)
  - Total: 57,682
- Website: https://www.economia.gob.mx/datamexico/en/profile/geo/jojutla

Jojutla is a municipality in the state of Morelos, Mexico. Its municipal seat is the city of Jojutla de Juárez. The name Jojutla comes from Nahuatl Xoxōuhtlān (pronounced [ʃoˈʃoːʍtɬaːn]) and means, Place of abundant blue skies. Another interpretation is Jojutla should be written Xo-Xoutla and its etymological roots come from: xoxou-ki, (dye called indigo) and Tla-ntli, (teeth) to indicate abundance, so the name means: Place abundant in blue paint. This meaning is corroborated by Father José Agapito Mateo Minos in Nohualco Tlalpixtican (1722), about how he saw the maceration and decanting tanks of the xoxouki plant, when it still existed in the plaza Zacate. Ángela Peralta mentions a unique pyramid consisting of three parts: the momozok, the turret and the campanile (tower), demolished by the colonial government. Remnants of this can be seen in the staircase of the municipal palace.

Lake Tequesquitengo and part of the Sierra de Huautla Biosphere Reserve are located in the municipality of Jojutla.

== Geography ==
Jojutla is located in the southern area of the state of Morelos. It has a territorial area of approximately 149 km2, covering about 3.1% of the state’s surface area. Its geographical coordinates are 18°31’ to 18°41’ north latitude and 99°9’ to 99°18’ west longitude. It has an elevation ranging from 700 to 1,600 meters above sea level. According to the census, the total population of Jojutla is 57,682 inhabitants.

== History ==
=== Pre-hispanic history ===
The area that is Jojutla today was covered by the internal Sea of Plancarte in the Paleozoic Era. The first inhabitants are believed to have arrived 22,000 years ago. Although fragments of obsidian, ceramic, and pottery have been found in the atriums of the chapels of Teocalzingo, Guadalupe, and Tlatenchi, no serious archaeological studies have been undertaken in the area. The Codex Mendoza tells us that people lived in Jojutla from 1425 to 1436 CE, when they were conquered by the troops of Izcóatl and Nezahualcóyotl, and submitted to the Calpixca Acolhua of Tlaquiltenango and the lordship of Cuauhnáhuac.

=== Colonial Era ===
The exact date when the Spanish arrived is unclear, but the establishment of the town of San Miguel Xoxutla suggests they arrived on September 29 of 1522 or 1523, considering that in 1524 they inaugurated the bridge and dam of Cuernavaquita in Tlaquiltenango under orders from Hernán Cortés. The area was governed by Tlaquiltenango, particularly after the arrival of the religious orders in 1549 and 1604.

The area around Xoxutla was quite swampy, so agriculture was not very profitable. The principal economic activities were fishing, production of indigo dye, and basketry.

As the population increased, a Sunday market developed in the Plaza de Arriba (atrium the church of San Miguel). The opening of the Acapulco-México trade route in the 17th century and the bridge of Our Lady of Guadalupe over the Apatlaco River on July 16, 1616, encouraged the growth of the market.

One confusing fact as to the date of foundation of Jojutla is that 18 families headed by Ignacio de la Luz fled from Chimalacatlan because of an epidemic. The Dominican friars of the Villa de Tlaquiltenango accepted them in the town of San Jerónimo Metl, on April 14, 1695. Incidentally, this confusion in part comes from Dr. Santos Amador Espinoza, who wrote Notes on the history of the City of Jojutla de Juárez in 1895, but whose information was later contradicted by Father José Agapito Mateo Minos Campuzano. The town of San Jerónimo Metl itself was devastated by a cholera epidemic in May 1770.

On September 14, 1722, in hacienda of San Gabriel, the muleteer José Cerón found an image of the crucified Christ, which was taken to the chapel of the hacienda, only to mysteriously disappear three times. The Dominican friars then took it their monastery in Tlaquiltenango on January 1, 1723, when it again disappeared, only to reappear on the main altar of the chapel of Our Lady of Guadalupe, of the town of Archangel San Miguel Xoxutla. Since that time, there has been a festival in Xoxutla (Jojutla).

=== Independence & 19th century ===
During the War of Mexican Independence Juan Antonio Tlaxcoapan of Tlaquiltenango led a group of citizens to meet Generals Vicente Guerrero and Nicolás Bravo in Chimalacatlan on September 8, 1813. The citizens of Jojutla did not join the Insurgents in Chilpancingo, and once their army withdrew Tlaxcoapan was taken prisoner and shot by Spanish authorities on November 6, 1813. Today he is recognized as a local hero.

Ricardo Sánchez moved to Jojutla on March 15, 1830, and in 1836 he introduced the cultivation of brown rice. Sánchez lobbied for the municipalization of the town of the Archangel San Miguel Xoxutla, which was granted by the government of the State of Mexico on March 29, 1847. Sánchez became the first municipal president and he rescheduled the feast of the Lord of Tula from September 14 to January 1.

The Jojutla Railway began on September 21, 1890.

On April 14, 1895, at the initiative of a group led by the priest Agapito Mateo Minos Campuzano, Jojutla celebrated its bicentennial.

=== Revolution & 20th century ===
There was a bloody battle during the Mexican Revolution until the city was taken and looted by Maderistas under the command of Pablo Torres Burgo, and Gabriel Tepepa. The Revolutionaries sacked the city.

=== 21st century ===
Andres Eloy Martínez Rojas, a Mexican astronomer (b. Cuernavaca, 1953) discovered a crater on Mars, which he named Jojutla. In 2017 the asteroid (6159) Andréseloy (1991 YH) was named in his honor.

An illegal, secret graveyard used by the government was discovered in Jojutla in March 2017. This was similar to the one found in Tetelcingo two years earlier. Of the 85 bodies found in Jojutla, 54 involved cases that the police had not even bothered to investigate. 30,000 people have "disappeared" in Mexico in the years up to February, 2018.

Jojutla was hit harder than anywhere else in Morelos during the September 19, 2017 earthquake. At least 73 people died and hundreds were injured. 652 homes were destroyed, 1,157 were damaged, and many other buildings, including schools and the Palacio Municipal (city hall), were damaged. More than two years later, in January 2020, residents were still waiting for reconstruction.

Juan Angel Flores Bustamonte of Juntos Haremos Historia (Together we will make history coalition) was elected Presidente Municipal (mayor) in the election of July 1, 2018.

Two parachutists died on March 23, 2019, when their equipment failed and they landed in the Autopista del Sol at Kilometer 132, near Jardines de Mexico. They were employed by a school of parachutes in the area. Festival Vaivén 2019 (art & music festival) was held in Jardines de Mexico on March 30, 2019.

La Secundaria Técnica número 34 in Jojutla was the first middle school in the country to give classes in agroecology.

As of May 4, 2020, there were 505 infections and 59 deaths in the state of Morelos and 18 confirmed infections from the COVID-19 pandemic in Jojutla. Schools and many businesses were closed from mid March until June 1.

In 2019 Hortencia Figueroa Peralta from Jojutla, former leader (PRD) of the state legislature, was convicted of misuse of MXN $23.7 million earmarked for employees. She won a temporary injunction against being sent to prison, but in May 2020 that expired and she will soon be sent to the state penitentiary in Atlacholoaya.

The state of Morelos reported 209 cases and 28 deaths due to the COVID-19 pandemic in Mexico, as of April 27, 2020. Schools and many businesses were closed from mid March until June 1. The state office of DIF sent food and water to vulnerable groups of people in eight municipalities including Jojutla on May 26. On June 2, Jojutla reported 94 confirmed cases and 17 deaths from the virus; the reopening of the state was pushed back until at least June 13. Jojutla reported 211 cases, 145 recuperations, and 46 deaths from the virus as of August 31. Three hundred sixty-two cases were reported on December 27, 2020. The hospital dedicated to the care of serious COVID-19 cases reached 100% capacity on January 15, 2021.

== Notable people ==
=== Politics and military ===
- Fernando Amilpa Rivera (b. in Jojutla in 1898–1952), union leader Confederation of Mexican Workers and federal deputy.
- Jacinto Leyva Iguzquiza (1897–1972), Zapatista soldier, businessman, federal deputy (1930), municipal president.
- Juan Antonio Tlaxcoapan (b. in Arcángel San Miguel Xoxutla – d. 1813), Indigenous and citizen of Spain who served as alderman in Tlaquiltenango during the Mexican War of Independence. He had talks with Vicente Guerrero and Nicolas Bravo prior to the Congress of Chilpancingo. He was executed by firing squad in Tlaquiltenango in 1813.

=== Religion ===
- Manuel Pío López Estrada (b. in Jojutla 1891–1971), 6th bishop of Veracruz, and first archbishop of Roman Catholic Archdiocese of Xalapa (1939–1968).
- José Agapito Mateos Minos (b. in Jojutla 1850–1926 in Mexico City), priest and historian, author of “Apuntaciones Históricas de Xoxutla a Tlaquiltenango”.

=== Arts ===
- Abraham Enzástiga Menes, founder and director of the Jojutla Symphony Orchestra
- Frances Erskine Inglis, 1st Marquise of Calderón de la Barca (1806–1882), Scottish wife Ángel Calderón de la Barca, who was the first plenipotentiary prime minister of Spain in independent Mexico. Ingles arrived in Cuernavaca in 1841 and lived in Atlacumolco. She wrote Life in Mexico in 1843.

=== Science and research ===
- Manuel Mazari Puerto (b. 1891–1935), homeopahic doctor and researcher, wrote "Bosquejo histórico del Estado de Morelos".
- Andrés Eloy Martínez Rojas (born 1963), astronomer, lives in Jojutla. In 2006 he discovered and named the Jojutla crater on Mars. He represented the 4th district (Jojutla) in the Congress of the Union (2012–2015) MORENA.

=== Sports ===
- Mónica Ocampo Medina (b. 1987 in Jojutla) is a Mexican professional footballer who plays as a forward for Pachuca and the Mexico women's national football team.
- Irving Adrián Pérez Pineda (b. in Jojutla May 16, 1986) is a Mexican triathlete. He competed in the men's event at the 2016 Summer Olympics.
- Valeria Pulido Velasco (b. in Jojutla 1990) is a former professional tennis player.

=== Others historical figures ===
- Ricardo Sánchez (d. 1858), introduced rice production to Jojutla in 1840
- Joaquín Fandiño, born in Jojutla

== Communities ==
- Jojutla de Juárez is the municipal seat. The city has 45% of the total population in the municipality and is located 45 km from Cuernavaca. There are two hospitals, three universities, and three high schools. Jojutla has 17,777 inhabitants and is located at an altitude of 882 meters.
- Unidad Habitacional Morelos has 25% of the municipal population and is located 7 km from Jojutla de Juarez. It is a residential community. It has a population of 3,688
- Tehuixtla is a ranching and agricultural community with an important tourist sector. 9% of the population live there; 15 km from Jojutla de Juarez. There are 6,500 inhabitants and it is located at an altitude of 879 meters. ISSSTEHUIXTLA, a waterpark run by the social service agency for government workers, is located in the community.
- Tlatenchi is a ranching and agricultural community 5 km from Jojutla de Juarez. There are 5,787 inhabitants and is located at an altitude of 899 meters.
- Tequesquitengo is a small tourist community on the shores of the lake by the same name. It has a permanent population of 3,266 inhabitants and is located 10 km from Jojutla de Juarez.

According to the 2020 census data, the municipality of Jojutla contains 74 localities, with the largest listed below:

Locality	Population (2020)
Jojutla de Juárez	17,777
Tehuixtla	6,500
Tlatenchi	5,787
Pedro Amaro	5,748
Higuerón	5,015
Tequesquitengo	3,266
José María Morelos y Pavón	3,244
Jicarero	1,300
Los Venados	1,010
Other localities	8,035
Total	57,682

== Tourist attractions ==
=== Lake Tequesquitengo ===
Known as The Sea of Morelos, Lake Tequesquitengo provides relaxation and fun such as water skiing, skydiving, snorkeling, bungee jumping, or scuba diving. There are hotels around the lake in all price categories.Teques is a popular weekend destination for Mexicans from the capital and the State of Morelos.

The lake has a tragic history. The general belief is that the village of Tequesquitengo was flooded by the Mosso brothers, who—according to Alfonso Toussaint—owned the San José Vista Hermosa hacienda in the mid-19th century, which was erected during the colonial era in the upper part of the valley. Newspapers of the nineteenth century pointed out that in the northern part of the valley there was a small lagoon, which was sustenance for the colonial town of Tequesquitengo, in addition to the tequesquite, a mineral from which the settlement took its name. Until a difference between the peasants and the hacendados caused the latter to divert the flow of surplus water from the irrigation channels of the hacienda to the valley, flooding it and forcing its settlers to settle on the shores of the lake that formed covering the town and its church, San Juan Bautista.

Scholars differ about when the flooding began, suggesting dates between 1820 and 1880, with some blaming the earthquake of 1845.

=== Waterparks ===
In addition to Lake Tequesquitengo, there are seven waterparks in the municipality:

- Aqua Splash waterpark. 5 minutes from Tequesquitengo. Capacity for 8,000. 8 swimming pools, wave pool, Kamakazi, athletic fields.
- La Plata waterpark. 6 swimming pools, 3 wading pools, 5 water slides, athletic fields.
- Las Palmas waterpark. 3 swimming pools, camping area, 6 cabins, athletic fields. There is an artificial lake connected to Rio Amacuzac with a protected area for iguanas and other animals. Located in Tehuixtla.
- Cocos Bugambilia waterpark. Swimming pool, wading pool, dance floor.
- Los Naranjos waterpark. 2 pools, restaurant, campground. Located in Panchimalco.
- Issstehuixtla waterpark. Government run, open to the public. 6 swimming pools, wading pool, diving pool, athletic fields, cabins, campground. There is a 9-meter deep natural pool with sulfur water. Located in Tehuixtla.

=== Historical and cultural sites ===
The Ex-hacienda La Perseverancia (The Perseverance) was founded in 1870 and has a rice mill.

Jardines de Mexico (Garden of Mexico), located in Tehuixla, is the largest ornamental garden in the world. There are 65 million flowers and 22,000 trees in seven gardens over an area of 51 hectares (130 acres). An annual hot-air balloon fest is offered there. Festival Vaivén 2019 (art & music festival) was celebrated in Jardines de Mexico, March 30, 2019.

The town of Chisco is not far from Lake Tequesquitengo. Visitors can enjoy Class 3 river rafting and tubing on the Amacuzac River; mountain biking (500 km; 310 mi of tracks); ultralight aviation; camping; and more. (Temporarily closed).

== Sports, fiestas, dances, traditions ==
=== Festivals ===
==== January ====
- New Year's Fair, January 1–10, Jojutla de Juárez. This is the most important festival in the community. It commemorates the discovery of a black cruxifix in 1772 that somehow disappeared several times until miraculously reappearing at the chapel of Guadalupe in Xoxotla. The Señor de Tula (Lord of Tula) was honored from September 14, 1724, until 1848; since that time the holiday has been celebrated on January 1.

==== February ====
- Flag Day, February 24–28, Jicarero.

==== March ====
- Cultural Week, March 21–29, Jojutla.
- Festival Vaivén 2019 (art & music festival) was celebrated in Jardines de Mexico, March 30, 2019.

==== June ====
- Feria del Arroz (Rice fair), June (exact dates vary) Jojutla (7 days).
- Feast of San Juan, June 24, Panchimalco.

==== September ====
- Feast of Santa María, September 8, Tlatenchi.
- Independence Day celebrations, mid-September in Jojutla.

==== October ====
- Feast of St. Francis of Assisi, October 4, Higuerón.
- Feast of the Our Lady of the Rosary, 1st Sunday of October, Tehuixtla (5 days)

==== November ====
- Day of the Dead, November 1 & 2.
- Revolution Day, November 20 (traditional); 3rd Monday of November (official).

==== December ====
- Our Lady of Guadalupe, December 11 & 12.
- Las Posadas, December 16–24.
- Most families celebrate Christmas Eve on December 24, although December 25 is the official holiday.

=== Music and dances ===
Traditional dances and music in Jojutla are performed by brass bands to accompany the dances of Los Tecuanes, Las Pastoras, and Chinelos at festivals.

The Danza de los Tecuanes is a traditional masked dance rooted in pre-Hispanic cultural practices, in which the masks symbolize transformation and a connection to the spiritual world. The dance tells the story of a wild, man-eating beast called the Tecuán that attacks domestic animals, such as pigs, goats, donkeys, and rabbits, threatening the food supply of villagers. The villagers work alongside the Lord of the Mountain to lure and defeat the beast. They celebrated their victory with an 8-day-long festival. Performances include eight dancers dressed as domestic animals, two hunters with shotguns, and one dancer as Tecuán. Throughout the performance, Tecuán would interact with people in the audience. This performance is typically danced during Lent and regional fairs.

Los Pastores is a traditional form of devotional theater performed on Christmas Eve after Las Posadas. The performance involves music and religious readings about the journey of the shepherds and other biblical themes. It was inspired by Spanish colonial theater and Indigenous cultural practices.

The Chinelos are traditional masked dancers from the state of Morelos. The dance is typically seen during Carnival and other festivals. The tradition originated from Indigenous and Spanish colonial Catholic Carnival traditions. The dance often mocks European elites from the colonial period through its costumes and mannerisms.

=== Sports ===
The municipality of Jojutla has several sports facilities that host sporting events and recreational activities. The primary facility used is the Unidad Deportiva la Perseverancia. This facility has areas created for recreational and cultural activities. Since 1992, it has offered a variety of recreational activities such as soccer, American football, swimming, squash, running and walking tracks, aerobics, zumba, and yoga. Some cultural events include contemporary, ballroom, and regional dancing.

=== Cuisine ===
Red, white, and green pozole; corn tamales of all kinds: fish, nopales (cactus leaves) with onions, huazmole (a goat stew made with jumbay; different rice plates; cecina; barbecue; and tacos dorados (tacos made with deep-fried torillas).

== Economy ==
Agriculture is the most important economic activity in Jojutla. Sugarcane, rice, corn, beans, jicama, and watermelons are grown. Livestock are raised for both meat and dairy. The industrial sector is small, with only two companies; one produces wires and conductors, while the other produces boxes and disposable plates.

Jojutla is an important trading center not only within the municipality, but it also draws customers from other areas in the south part of the state of Morelos. Tourism is important, with Lake Tequesquitengo, Jardines de Mexico, four spas, three water parks, thirty-five restaurants, and twenty-two hotels.

== Sierra de Huautla ==
Established in 2006, the Sierra de Huautla Biosphere Reserve (REBIOSH) covers 59,031 hectares (145,870 acres) in the Balsas River Basin of the municipalities of Jojutla, Tlaquiltenango, Amacuzac, Tepalcingo, and Puente de Ixtla. Its rough topology varies from 700 to 2,240 meters (2,300 to 7,350 ft) above sea level in the Balsas Basin and constitutes a rich reservoir of endemic species to Mexico. There is a broad range of ecosystem, including low deciduous forest, gallery vegetation, and pine and oak forests. 939 species of plants, 44 species of butterflies, 71 species of mammals, 208 species of birds, 53 species of reptiles, 18 species of amphibians, and 14 species of fish have been noted. Among the species of animals are jaguars, short-horned Baronia butterfly, beaded lizard, military macaw, roufus-backed robin, Balsas screech owl, Pileated flycatcher, mountain lion, ocelot, margay, bobcat, and jaguarundi.

== Politics ==
The government of the municipality of Jojutla is composed of a municipal president, a community representative, and a council of nine members, where four are elected by majority rule and five by proportional representation.

All officials are elected by direct, secret, and universal votes for a three-year term. Officials are eligible for re-election to one consecutive term.

=== Legislative representation ===
The elections for local deputies in the Congress of Morelos and federal deputies in the Chamber of Deputies are part of the following electoral districts:

Local: 11th Electoral District of Morelos, municipal seat in Jojutla

Federal: 4th Electoral District of Morelos, municipal seat in Jojutla

=== Municipal Presidents of Jojutla ===
- Adalberto Sámano – 1961-1964
- Ángel Ocampo Ocampo – 1964-1967
- Adalberto Sámano – 1967-1970
- Rubén Román Sánchez – 1970-1973
- Marcos Rodríguez Duarte – 1973-1976
- Raúl Meléndez Betancourt – 1976-1979
- Lucino Espín Herrera – 1979-1982
- Lino Ocampo Olivares – 1982-1985
- Ismael Rivera Velázquez – 1985-1988
- Alberto Rueda Retiguín – 1988-1991
- Gregorio Rosas García – 1991-1994
- Roberto Huicochea Rodríguez – 1994-1997
- Antonio Pastrana Quevedo – 1997-2000
- Atanasio Pérez Villalobos – 2000-2003
- Alfredo Zepeda Huicochea – 2003
- Nelson Torres Mondragón – 2003-2006
- Alberto Cabrera Díaz – 2006-2009
- Enrique Retiguin Morales – 2009-2012
- Hortencia Figueroa Peralta – 2012-2015
- Alfonso de Jesús Sotelo Martínez - 2015-2018
- Lic. Juan Ángel Flores Bustamante 2018 - 2021
- Lic. Juan Ángel Flores Bustamante 2022 - 2024 (Reelected)
- Alan Francisco Martínez García - Present - 2027

== See also ==
- List of people from Morelos
- Jorge Carrillo Olea
