= José Pavez =

Mexican footballer (born 1969)

Personal information
- Full name: José Eduardo Pavez López
- Date of birth: October 13, 1969 (age 57)
- Place of birth: Tehuixtla, Mexico
- Position: Midfielder

International career
Years	Team	Apps	(Gls)
??	Mexico U23	??	(??)

José Eduardo Pavez López (born October 13, 1969) is a Mexican former professional footballer. He played as a midfielder during his career. He was a member of the Mexico national football team competing at the 1992 Summer Olympics in Barcelona, Spain.

== See also ==
- List of people from Morelos
