= Fidel Demédicis Hidalgo =

Mexican politician

- Born: 23 March 1956 (age 70); Temixco, Morelos, Mexico
- Occupation: Senator

Fidel Demédicis Hidalgo (born 23 March 1956) is a Mexican politician. He served as a senator of the LXII and LXIII Legislatures of the Mexican Congress, representing Morelos.

== Life ==
Demédicis was born in Temixco and began his career in business, assisting on a hydroelectric project in Chiapas and maintaining the air conditioning systems at the Cancún and Cozumel international airports. He returned to Temixco in 1983, becoming a teacher at Secondary Technical School #21; while there, he earned a degree in political science from the UNAM and became active in the SNTE teachers' union.

Demédicis began his political career in 1997, when the PRD ran him as its candidate for municipal president of Temixco; at the time, he had been the deputy director of Secondary Technical School #36, also in Temixco. He rose through the ranks of the state PRD hierarchy, serving as the secretary of organization for the Morelos state executive committee from 1999 to 2002 and as its secretary general from 2002 to 2003. In 2003, Demédicis was elected to the first of two nonconsecutive terms in the Congress of Morelos; in between, he represented the PRD on a reform commission and served as the state party's finance secretary.

Demédicis ran for and won a seat in the Senate in the 2012 election, serving for six years. He presided over the Rural Development Commission in both the LXII and LXIII Legislatures and served on three others—Foreign Relations (North America), Communications and Transportation, and Education—throughout his tenure.

In 2017, Demédicis left the Party of the Democratic Revolution, accusing it of betraying its ideals and the PRD state government of having incited terror and fear in Morelos. He later joined the Labor Party caucus. After the state PT expressed concerns about a potential Demédicis candidacy, and the party entered into coalition with Morena and nominated Cuauhtémoc Blanco, Demédicis mounted an independent candidacy in which he renounced all public funding. He finished fifth on election day, drawing just under five percent of the vote.

== See also ==
- List of people from Morelos
