= Yolanda Quijano =

Mexican painter and sculptor

Yolanda Quijano is a Mexican painter and sculptor whose work has been recognized with membership in the Salón de la Plástica Mexicana.

== Life ==
Quijano was born Merida, Yucatán in 1933 but later in life moved to Cuernavaca, Morelos, where she still lives.

When she was a girl she was interesting in creating things and wanted to be an inventor. However, an accident which burned her convinced her to go in to change her career aspirations to medicine, which she studied in college.

After marrying, she stopped working to become a housewife, becoming the mother of future artists Adriano Silva Pantoja and Alejandro Quijano. This gave to her time to begin painting, starting by teaching herself, drawing what was around her.

Later she took a class and friends urged her to study more formally at La Escuela de Pintura y Escultura “La Esmeralda,” studying there from 1959 to 1961.

During her career, she has also been active in cultural organizations such as the Salón de la Plástica Mexicana, the Movimiento Pictórico Mexicano, the Sociedad Mexicana de Arte Plástica, the Sociedad Cultural Sor Juana Inés de la Cruz, Summa de Talentos and the Movimiento Nacional de Mujeres.

== Career ==
Her work has been shown in over fifty collective exhibitions and she has had eleven individual shows, including those at the Museo de Arte Contemporáneo (UNAM), Ateneo de Yucatán, the Museo de la Ciudad de Toluca and the Otumba Museum.

Her work has been recognized with a number of awards including the José Guadalupe Posada (INJUVE) Award in 1966, the Painting Prize of the Secretary of the Navy in 1967, a diploma of merit from the Instituto Mexicano de Café in 1976, Woman of the Decade in Mexico (1970-1980), honorific mention at the Salon de Escultura of the Salón de la Plástica Mexicana (1986) and the Sor Juana de Inés Prize.

== Artistry ==
She is stated as saying that “Everything is magic. Life without magic is not life.” Her work has been influenced by movements such as magical realism, abstract expressionism and surrealism. The feminine figure is always present in her work, and appear as mythical creatures such as mermaids, or as angels or historical figures, especially Sor Juana Inés de la Cruz, whom she admires greatly.

== See also ==
- List of people from Morelos
