= Andrés Eloy Martínez =

Mexican astronomer, scientist and politician

- Born: 23 June 1963 (age 62); Cuernavaca, Morelos, Mexico
- Occupations: Astronomer; former federal deputy
- Political party: PRD (1980s–2014); MORENA (2014–present)

Andrés Eloy Martínez Rojas (born 23 June 1963) is a Mexican astronomer, scientist and politician. He has named various minor planets and also served one three-year term as a deputy in the 62nd session of the Congress of the Union, representing Morelos's fourth district.

== Astronomy ==
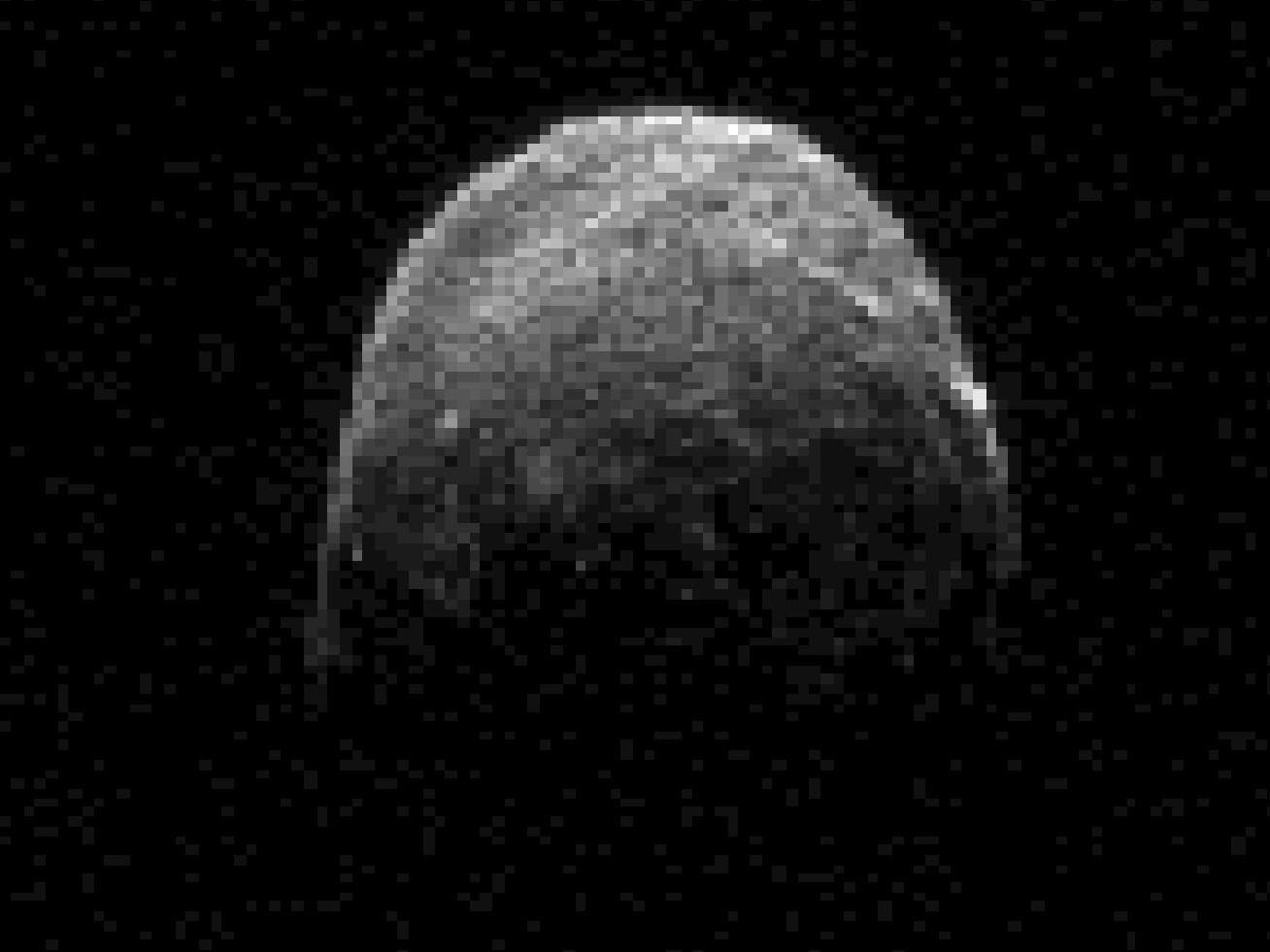
Radar image of asteroid 2013TV135

Martínez Rojas has discovered various minor planets and has proposed names for planetary features. In addition to 10 supernovas, he discovered the minor planets 2010 RJ_{137}, 2004 LV_{31}, and 2004 LW_{31}. In 2017, the minor planet 6159 Andréseloy was named in his honor.

In 2003, he proposed to name a newly discovered crater on Mars after Jojutla, which was approved by the International Astronomical Union in 2007.

Martínez Rojas presides over the Sociedad Astronómica Urania de México, an astronomy society. In 2015, the society successfully proposed the names Tonatiuh and Meztli for the HD 104985 system and planet HD 104985b, respectively, which were selected in the NameExoWorlds worldwide contest. Additionally, he has written science columns for various publications including El Universal and Scientific American México; he formerly hosted a radio show on XHART-FM, which is owned by his mother, Araceli Rojas Tenorio. He carried out the 1998 and 2008 reenactments of The War of the Worlds that the station aired, causing panic among its listeners.

He is currently regional coordinator of Asteroid Day in Mexico.

== Federal deputy ==
In 2012, residents of the fourth federal electoral district of Morelos, based in Jojutla, elected Martínez Rojas as the candidate of the Party of the Democratic Revolution (PRD) to the district's seat in the Chamber of Deputies. He was a secretary on the Science and Technology Commission and also served on the Communications and Rural Development Commissions. While at the Chamber of Deputies, he helped to install a radiotelescope in the San Lázaro Legislative Palace.

In 2014, Martínez Rojas changed parties from the PRD to the National Regeneration Movement (MORENA).
