= Hector Lamadrid-Figueroa =

Mexican public health professional

Héctor Lamadrid-Figueroa, born 1976, is a Mexican public health professional who is Chair of the Department of Perinatal Health at the National Institute of Public Health of Mexico and a member of the Mexican Academy of Sciences. He works in public health, including epidemiology, maternal and child health, environmental health, and program impact evaluation.

== Education ==
Lamadrid-Figueroa obtained a medical degree from the Universidad Autónoma del Estado de Morelos in 2001, a Masters in Science degree in Epidemiology from Mexico's National Institute of Public Health in 2003, and a Doctorate in Science degree from the same institution in 2008.

== Career in public health ==
Lamadrid-Figueroa's work includes studies on maternal health, the impact of prenatal lead exposure, and the scope of Mendelian randomization in epidemiology. He has also contributed to research on the burden of cancer in Mexico. He has also led research on the impact of cesarean sections on child neurodevelopment, highlighting the potential long-term effects of elective C-sections. Lamadrid-Figueroa is a member of Sigma Xi, the Scientific Research Honor Society, and a founding member of the Global Evaluation & Monitoring Network for Health. In 2025, Lamadrid-Figueroa was named a regular member of the Mexican Academy of Sciences.

== Chess ==
Lamadrid-Figueroa secured second place in the FIDE World Amateur Chess Championship 2019 in the Sub 2000 category. He has a best Elo rating of 1933, a standard rating of 1897, and a rapid rating of 1962.
