= Viva Zapata! =

1952 film by Elia Kazan

- Theatrical release poster
- Directed by: Elia Kazan
- Written by: John Steinbeck
- Produced by: Darryl F. Zanuck
- Starring: Marlon Brando; Jean Peters; Anthony Quinn; Joseph Wiseman; Arnold Moss; Alan Reed; Margo; Harold Gordon; Lou Gilbert; Mildred Dunnock
- Cinematography: Joseph MacDonald
- Edited by: Barbara McLean
- Music by: Alex North
- Distributed by: 20th Century-Fox
- Release date: February 13, 1952
- Running time: 113 minutes
- Country: United States
- Language: English
- Budget: $1.8 million
- Box office: $1.9 million (US rentals)

Viva Zapata! is a 1952 American biographical Western film directed by Elia Kazan, dramatizing the life of Mexican revolutionary Emiliano Zapata from his peasant upbringing through his rise to power in the early 1900s and his death in 1919. It stars Marlon Brando as the title character, and features Jean Peters as his wife Josefa and Anthony Quinn as his brother Eufemio. The screenplay was written by John Steinbeck, using Edgcumb Pinchon's 1941 book Zapata the Unconquerable as a guide.

To make the film as authentic as possible, Kazan and producer Darryl F. Zanuck studied the numerous photographs that were taken during the revolutionary years, the period between 1909 and 1919, when Zapata led the fight to restore land taken from common people during the dictatorship of Porfirio Díaz. Kazan was especially impressed with the Agustín Casasola collection of photographs, and he attempted to duplicate their visual style in the film. Kazan also acknowledged the influence of Roberto Rossellini's Paisan (1946).

The film was released by 20th Century Fox on February 13, 1952. It received generally positive reviews from critics and was nominated for five Academy Awards, with Anthony Quinn winning for Best Supporting Actor.

== Plot ==
Emiliano Zapata is part of a delegation sent to complain about injustices to corrupt longtime president Porfirio Díaz, but Díaz dismisses their concerns, driving Zapata to open rebellion, along with his brother Eufemio. He unites with Pancho Villa under the leadership of naive reformer Francisco Madero.

Díaz is finally toppled and Madero takes his place, but Zapata is dismayed to find that nothing is changing. Madero offers Zapata land of his own while failing to take action to distribute land to the campesinos who fought to end the dictatorship and break up the estates of the elites. Zapata rejects the offer and seeks no personal gain. Meanwhile, the ineffectual but well-meaning Madero puts his trust in treacherous general Victoriano Huerta. Huerta first takes Madero captive and then has him murdered.

As it becomes clear that each new regime is no less corrupt and self-serving than the one it replaced, Zapata remains guided by his desire to return to the peasants their recently robbed lands while forsaking his personal interests. His brother sets himself up as a petty dictator, taking what he wants without regard for the law, but Zapata remains a rebel leader of high integrity. Although he is able to defeat Huerta after Madero's assassination, as a result of his integrity, Zapata loses his brother and his position.

Although in the end Zapata himself is lured into an ambush and killed, the film suggests that the resistance of the campesinos does not end. Rumors begin that Zapata never died, but is instead continuing to fight from the hills, feeding the campesinos a sense of hope. As several scenes suggest, over the years, the campesinos have learned to lead themselves rather than looking to others to lead them.

== Cast ==
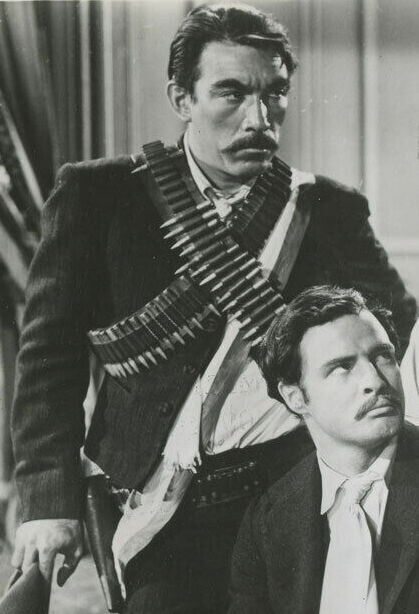
Anthony Quinn as Eufemio Zapata (standing), and Marlon Brando as Emiliano Zapata in a publicity photo for the film

- Marlon Brando as Emiliano Zapata
- Jean Peters as Josefa Zapata, his wife
- Anthony Quinn as Eufemio Zapata
- Joseph Wiseman as Fernando Aguirre
- Arnold Moss as Don Nacio
- Alan Reed as Pancho Villa
- Margo as Soldadera
- Harold Gordon as Francisco Ignacio Madero
- Lou Gilbert as Pablo
- Frank Silvera as Victoriano Huerta
- Florenz Ames as Señor Espejo
- Richard Garrick as Old General
- Fay Roope as Porfirio Díaz
- Mildred Dunnock as Señora Espejo

Uncredited

- Henry Silva as Hernández
- Frank de Kova as Colonel Guajardo
- Will Kuluva as Lazaro
- Pedro Regas as Innocente
- Ross Bagdasarian as Officer
- Abner Biberman as Captain

== Production ==
Filming took place in locations around the American Southwest, including Durango, Colorado, Roma, Texas, San Ygnacio, Texas in Zapata County, and New Mexico.

The screenplay was written by John Steinbeck based on Edgcomb Pinchon's 1941 book Zapata the Unconquerable. Steinbeck's screenplay has been published as a book along with a narrative of Zapata's life that Steinbeck also wrote.

Barbara Leaming writes in her biography of Marilyn Monroe that Monroe tried to obtain a part in the film, but failed, presumably because of Darryl F. Zanuck's lack of faith in her ability, both as an actress and as a box-office draw.

== Reception ==
Viva Zapata! received generally mixed to positive reviews from critics. On the review aggregator website Rotten Tomatoes, 53% of 17 critics' reviews are positive, with an average rating of 6.1/10.

Bosley Crowther of The New York Times wrote a highly favorable review and commented that the film "... throbs with a rare vitality, and a masterful picture of a nation in revolutionary torment has been got by Director Elia Kazan." Variety, however, criticized the direction and script: "Elia Kazan's direction strives for a personal intimacy but neither he nor the John Steinbeck scripting achieves in enough measure."

Senator John McCain listed Viva Zapata! as his favorite film of all time.

=== Awards and nominations ===
Award	Category	Nominee(s)	Result	Ref.
Academy Awards	Best Actor	Marlon Brando	Nominated	
Academy Awards	Best Supporting Actor	Anthony Quinn	Won	
Academy Awards	Best Story and Screenplay	John Steinbeck	Nominated	
Academy Awards	Best Art Direction – Black-and-White	Art Direction: Lyle R. Wheeler and Leland Fuller; Set Decoration: Thomas Little and Claude E. Carpenter	Nominated	
Academy Awards	Best Scoring of a Dramatic or Comedy Picture	Alex North	Nominated	
British Academy Film Awards	Best Film from any Source		Nominated	
British Academy Film Awards	Best Foreign Actor	Marlon Brando	Won	
Cannes Film Festival	Grand Prix	Elia Kazan	Nominated	
Cannes Film Festival	Best Actor	Marlon Brando	Won	
Directors Guild of America Awards	Outstanding Directorial Achievement in Motion Pictures	Elia Kazan	Nominated	
Golden Globe Awards	Best Supporting Actress – Motion Picture	Mildred Dunnock	Nominated	
International Film Music Critics Association Awards	Best New Recording of a Previously Existing Score	Alex North, Jerry Goldsmith, and Royal Scottish National Orchestra	Nominated	

=== Honors ===
The film is recognized by American Film Institute in these lists:

- 2005: AFI's 100 Years of Film Scores – Nominated
