= Eufemio Zapata =

Mexican revolutionary, brother of Emiliano Zapata

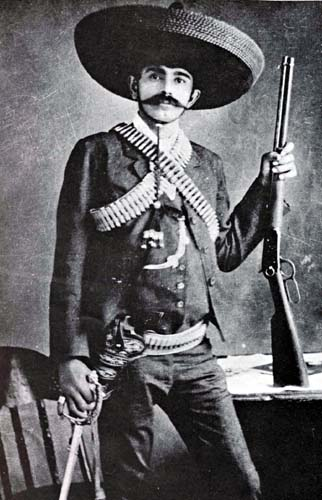
- Zapata, c. 1910
- Born: Eufemio Zapata Salazar; 1873; Villa de Ayala, Morelos, Mexico
- Died: June 18, 1917 (aged 43–44); Cuautla, Morelos, Mexico
- Cause of death: Assassination (gunshot wound)
- Occupation: Revolutionary in the Mexican Revolution
- Years active: 1910-1917

Eufemio Zapata Salazar (1873 in Villa de Ayala – June 18, 1917, in Cuautla, Morelos) was a Mexican revolutionary and participant in the Mexican Revolution and the brother of Mexican revolutionary Emiliano Zapata. He was known as a womanizer, a macho man, and an alcoholic.

== Military Service ==
Born in 1873 in Villa de Ayala, Morelos, Eufemio Zapata was the son of Gabriel Zapata and Cleofas Salazar and the brother of Emiliano Zapata. After completing his primary education in his hometown, he dedicated himself to various businesses in Veracruz, where he was a peddler, reseller and merchant, among other things. In 1911, he returned to the state of Morelos, where he joined the Maderista movement, led by Pablo Torres Burgos and his brother Emiliano to fight the dictator Porfirio Díaz. In May of that year, he participated in the siege and capture of Cuautla and rose to the rank of colonel. In August, he was commissioned by his brother Emiliano Zapata to meet and finalize an agreement with Francisco I. Madero, in Tehuacán, Puebla. After the failed attempt at a compromise, he signed the Plan of Ayala in November 1911, already with the rank of general.

In 1912, he operated in the south and west of Puebla, where he carried out, together with his brother, efforts to take the state capital during the month of March. On April 30, 1912, he formally returned the lands that he owned to the peasants of the town of Ixcamilpa, being one of the first agrarian redistributions in Mexico. Eufemio Zapata remained in arms against Victoriano Huerta.

In April 1914, he attacked and occupied haciendas and towns in southern Puebla, finally settling in Cuautla in August, where he appointed commissions of farmers with good local standing to carry out the agrarian work of land distribution. He accompanied Emiliano as his secretary to the first meeting that he had with Francisco Villa in Xochimilco. In mid-1915, he was entrusted with the direction and operation of the Cuahuixtla sugar mill. In 1916, he managed to maintain control of the region that extends from Yautepec to Tlaltizapán.

== Death ==
He was assassinated on June 18, 1917, in Cuautla, by General Sidronio Camacho, a subordinate alleging that Eufemio had beaten his father.

== In popular culture ==
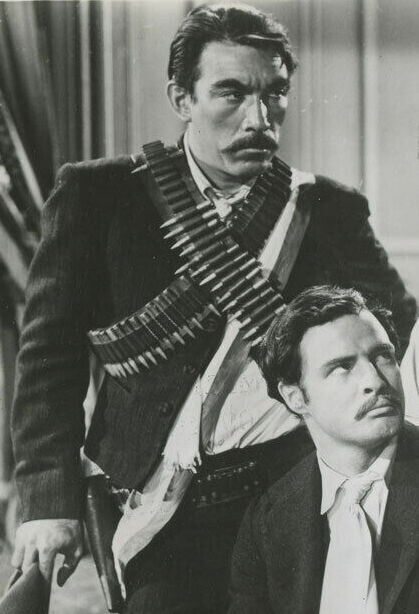
Anthony Quinn as Eufemio alongside Marlon Brando as Emiliano Zapata in ¡Viva Zapata! (1952).

- Eufemio Zapata was portrayed by actor Anthony Quinn in the 1952 film Viva Zapata!, a role which earned him an Academy Award for Best Supporting Actor.

== Sources ==
- Villa and Zapata: A History of the Mexican Revolution by Frank Mclynn
- Viva Zapata! (novel), John Steinbeck
- Mexican Revolution of 1910 at www.latinoartcommunity.org
- Biography in Spanish
- Eufemio Zapata, more than the older brother of the Leader of the South
