= El Diario =

Diario (Italian, Spanish "Diary") and El Diario (Spanish, "The Daily") may refer to:

== Newspapers, periodicals and websites ==
Alphabetical by country

- El Diario (Argentina)
- Diario (Aruba)
- El Diario (La Paz), Bolivia
- Diario Austral, Valdivia, Chile
- Diario de la Marina, Cuba
- Diario Libre, Dominican Republic
- El Diario de Hoy, El Salvador
- Diario de Centro América, Guatemala
- Diario (magazine) (1996–2009), Italy
- El Diario de Juárez, Ciudad Juárez, Chihuahua, Mexico
- El Diario (Mexico, 1906), Mexico City
- Diario de Morelia, Mexico
- El Diario de Nuevo Laredo, Mexico
- Diario de Yucatán, Mexico
- El Diario de Lima, Peru
- O Diário (1976–1990), Portugal
- Diário Económico, Portugal
- Diário de Manhã, Portugal
- El Diario (Spain)
- El Diario de Ferrol, Spain
- El Diario Montañés, Santander, Spain
- El Diario Vasco, Basque Country, Spain
- El Diario de El Paso, Texas, United States
- El Diario La Prensa, New York City, United States
- El Diario, Uruguay
- El Diario de Caracas, Venezuela

== Other uses ==
- Diario (Cultura Profética album), 2002
- Diário, a 2005 album by Mafalda Arnauth

== See also ==
- Diario Extra (disambiguation)
- Diario Oficial (disambiguation)
- Diary (disambiguation)
