= List of newspapers in Mexico =

Overview of newspapers and press history in Mexico

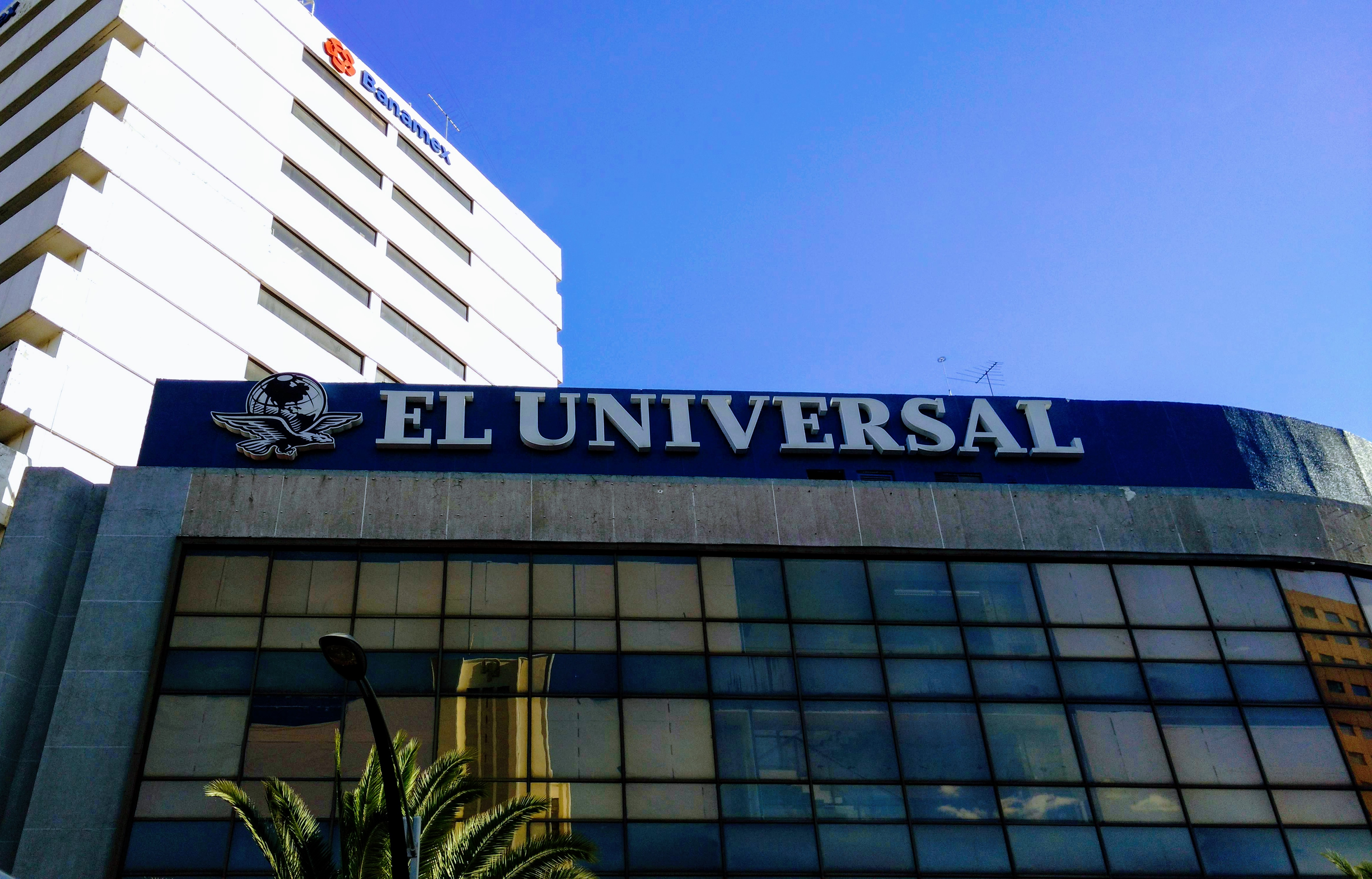
Headquarters of El Universal in Mexico City.

Newspapers in Mexico have played a significant role in shaping public opinion, fostering political movements, and documenting the country's social and cultural evolution. From colonial-era publications to modern digital media, Mexico's press landscape reflects the nation's complex history and democratic development.

== History ==
During the colonial period, Mexico's press was limited and strictly controlled by Spanish authorities. Following independence in the 19th century, newspapers became important platforms for political expression, often associated with liberal or conservative ideologies.

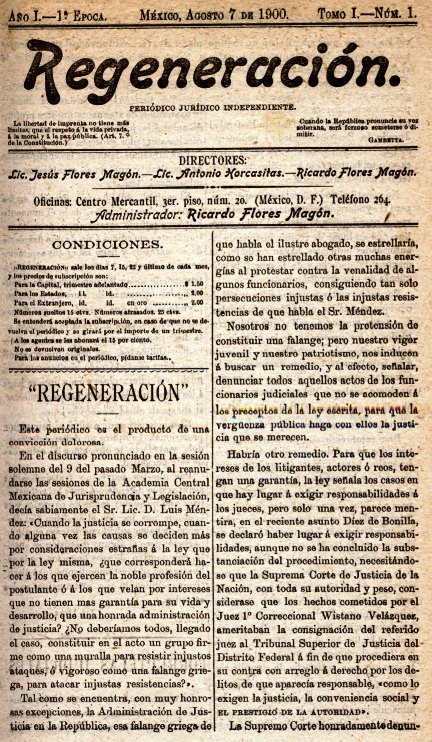
First issue of Regeneración, published August 7, 1900. The paper was founded by the Flores Magón brothers and became a key voice of opposition to the Porfirio Díaz regime.

In the early 20th century, the press played a critical role in the Mexican Revolution. Publications like Regeneración and El Hijo del Ahuizote were central in spreading liberal and anarchist ideas. Many journalists and editors were imprisoned or exiled due to their opposition to the government.

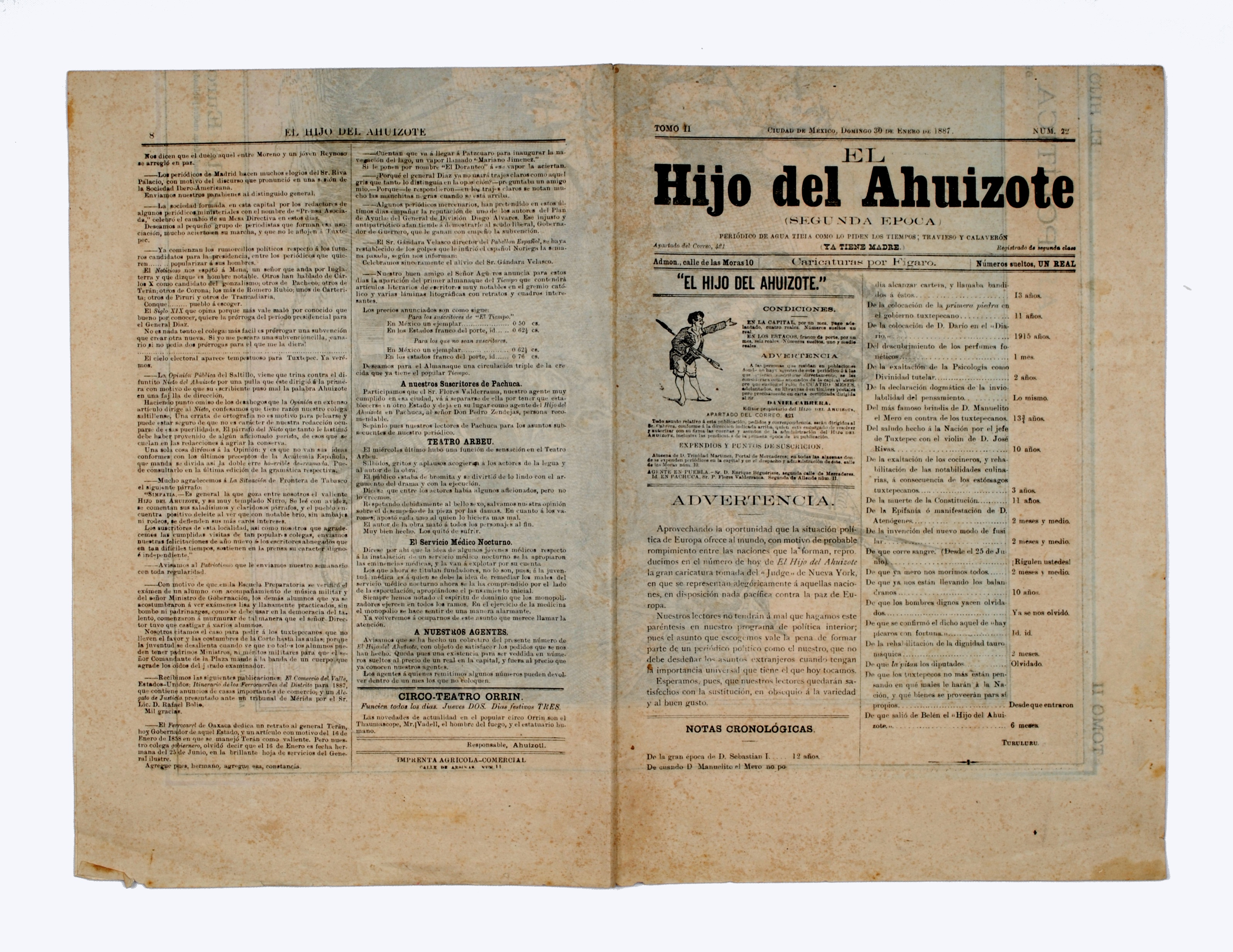
Pages of El Hijo del Ahuizote, a satirical newspaper published in the late 19th century.

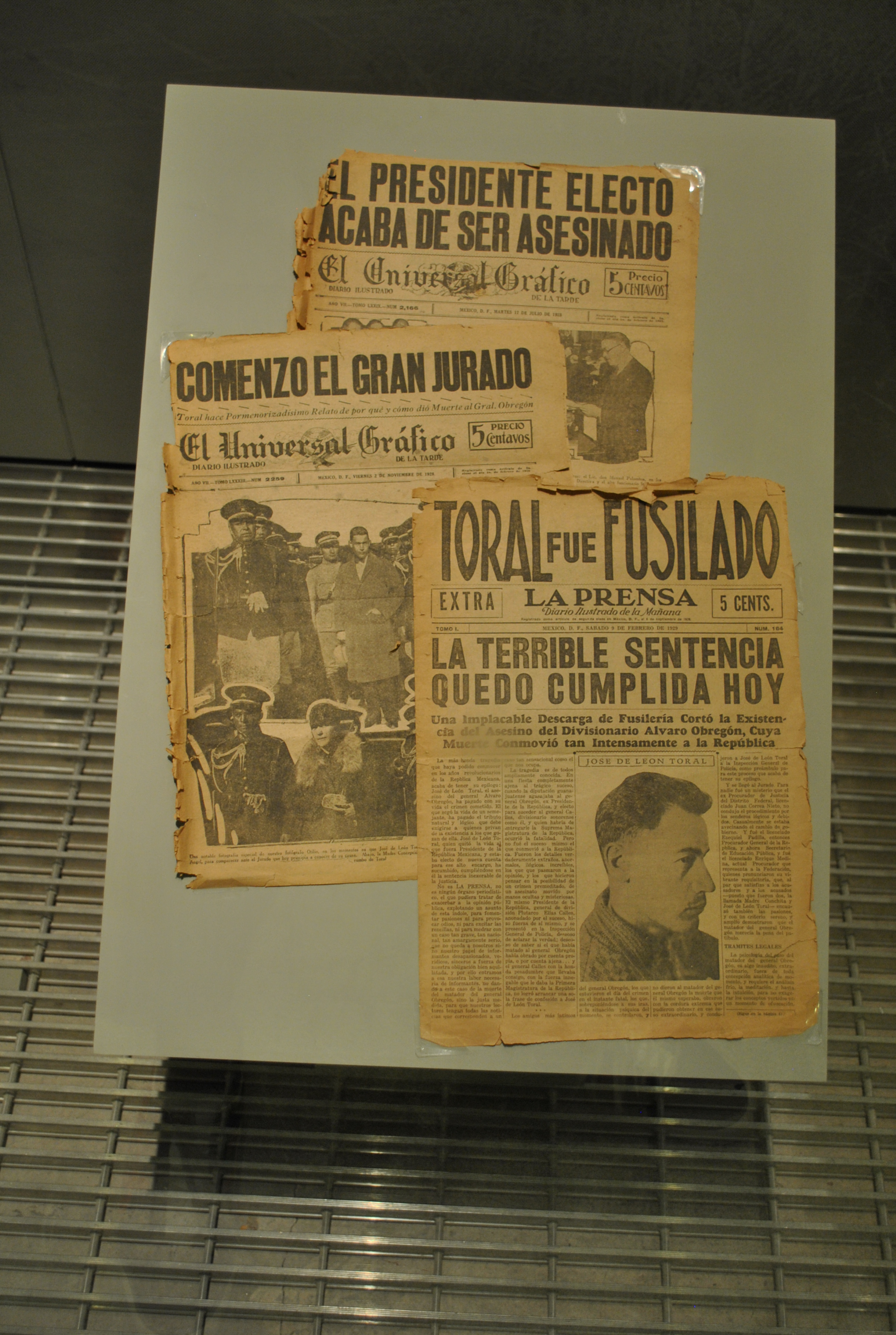
Newspapers covering the assassination of President Álvaro Obregón and the execution of José de León Toral, displayed at the National Museum of the Revolution.

Following the revolution, newspapers continued to influence public discourse, although many were subject to censorship or state influence, especially during the 20th-century dominance of the Institutional Revolutionary Party (PRI). Press freedom expanded significantly in the late 20th and early 21st centuries, although journalists in Mexico continue to face threats and violence.

== Current newspapers ==
Newspaper	Days of publication	Headquarters	Established
ABC	Daily	Monterrey, Nuevo León	1985
ABC		Toluca, Mexico	
La Afición		Mexico City	
El Autónomo		Guaymas, Sonora	
A.M.		León, Guanajuato	
Baja Times	Bi-weekly	Rosarito Beach, Baja California	1978
Biznews		Monterrey, Nuevo León	
Cambio de Michoacán		Michoacán	
Campeche HOY		Campeche City, Campeche	
Contexto		Durango	
Coyuntura			
Crítica	Daily	Hermosillo, Sonora	
Criterio		Hidalgo	
Crónica		Mexicali; most of Baja California, Baja California	
La Crónica de Hoy		Mexico City	1996
Cuarto Poder		Chiapas	
Cuestion		Mexico City	
El Debate		Culiacán, Sinaloa	
El Dia		Mexico City	
Diario de Acayucan		Acayucan, Veracruz	
Diario Amanecer			1980s
El Diario	Daily	Juarez, Chihuahua	
El Diario de Coahuila		Saltillo, Coahuila	
Diario de Colima	Daily	Colima City, Colima	
El Diario de Guadalajara	Daily	Jalisco	
Diario de México	Daily		
El Diario de Monterrey	Daily	Monterrey, Nuevo León	
El Diario de Morelos	Daily	Morelos	
El Diario de Sonora	Daily	Sonora	
Diario de Toluca	Daily	Toluca, Mexico	
Diario de Yucatán	Daily	Mérida, Yucatán	
Diario del Yaqui	Daily	Ciudad Obregón, Sonora	1942 (circa)
Diario Eyipantla Milenio	Daily	San Andrés Tuxtla, Veracruz	
Diario Los Tuxtlas	Daily	San Andrés Tuxtla, Veracruz	
Diario Oficial de la Federación	Daily		
Diario de Querétaro	Daily	Querétaro	
Diario Sonora de la Tarde	Daily	Ciudad Obregón, Sonora	
Diario Xalapa	Daily	Xalapa, Veracruz	
Diario Ventanas		Manzanillo, Colima	
El Dictamen	Daily	Veracruz, Veracruz	1898
El Eco de Nayarit		Nayarit	1917
El Economista			
Ecos de la Costa		Colima City, Colima	
Ecos de la Cuenca en Tepalcatepec	Weekly	Tepalcatepec, Michoacán	
Entorno Informativo		Hermosillo, Sonora	
Especialistas en Medios			
Esto		Mexico City	
Etcétera			
Excélsior		Mexico City	
Express		Tepic, Nayarit	
La Extra		Morelia	
El Financiero			
Frontera		Tijuana, Baja California	
Gente y Poder		Tepic, Nayarit	
Gringo Gazette		Baja California & Baja California Sur	
Grupo Diario de Morelia La Extra	Daily	Michoacán	
Guadalajara Reporter		Jalisco	
Hidrocálido		Aguascalientes	
El Heraldo		San Luis Potosí	
El Heraldo de Chihuahua	Daily	Chihuahua, Chihuahua	1927
El Heraldo de México		Mexico City	
El Heraldo de Saltillo		Saltillo, Coahuila	
El Heraldo de Tabasco		Tabasco	
El Heraldo de Toluca		Toluca, Mexico	
Imagen		Zacatecas	
El Imparcial		Oaxaca	
El Imparcial (Hermosillo)		Hermosillo, Sonora and Arizona	1937
El Informador		Guadalajara, Jalisco	
La Jerga: Periodismo Gonzo Independiente			
La Jornada		Mexico City	
Juárez Hoy		Ciudad Juárez	
El Mañana (Nuevo Laredo)		Tamaulipas	
El Mañana (Reynosa)		Reynosa	
El Mañana		Toluca, Mexico	
El Mercurio de Tamaulipas		Victoria, Tamaulipas	
Meridiano de Nayarit		Nayarit	
Mexican Online News			
El Mexicano		Tijuana, Baja California	
Mexico News Daily	Daily	Puerto Escondito, Oaxaca	2014
Milenio	Daily		
Milenio (Monterrey)	Daily	Nuevo León	
Mural		Guadalajara, Jalisco	
My Press		Mexico City	
El Nacional		Guanajuato	
El Nacional		Mexico City	
The News		Mexico City	
Noroeste		Culiacán and Mazatlán, Sinaloa	
El Norte		Monterrey, Nuevo León	
Noti Arandas		Arandas, Jalisco	
Notiver		Veracruz	
Novedad Acapulco		Guerrero	
Novedades de Quintana Roo		Cancún, Quintana Roo	
Novedades de Tabasco		Tabasco	
Novedades de Yucatán		Yucatán	
Nuevo Día		Nogales, Sonora	
Oaxaca Times		Oaxaca	
El Observador		Tepic, Nayarit	
El Occidental		Jalisco	
La Opinión		Puebla	
La Opinión de Poza Rica		Poza Rica, Veracruz	
La Opinión de Torreón		Torreón, Coahuila	
Ovaciones		Mexico City	
Percepción		Hermosillo, Sonora	
El Periódico AM		Hidalgo, Guanajuato	
Periódico Central		Puebla	
Periódico Correo		Guanajuato	
Periódico Vanguardia		Saltillo, Coahuila	
Por Esto!		Mérida, Yucatán	
El Porvenir		Monterrey, Nuevo León	
La Prensa		Mexico City	
La Prensa (Tamaulipas)		Tamaulipas	
La Prensa Sonora		Hermosillo, Sonora	
Primera Hora		Nuevo Laredo, Tamaulipas	
Primera Plana		Hermosillo, Sonora	
Público		Guadalajara, Jalisco	
Pulso		San Luis Potosí	
Realidades		Tepic, Nayarit	
Récord		Mexico City	
Reflexión Informativa Oaxaca		Oaxaca	
Reforma		Mexico City	
El Regional de Sonora		Ciudad Obregón, Sonora	
Ríodoce		Sinaloa	
Rumbo		Toluca	
Rumbo Nuevo		Tabasco	
Siglo 21			
El Siglo de Durango		Durango	
El Siglo de Torreón		Torreón, Coahuila	
Síntesis Hemerográfica Semanal	Weekly		
El Sol		Monterrey, Nuevo León	
El Sol de Acapulco		Guerrero	
El Sol de Cuautla		Cuautla, Morelos	
El Sol de Cuernavaca		Cuernavaca, Morelos	
El Sol de Hermosillo		Hermosillo, Sonora	
El Sol de Irapuato		Guanajuato	
El Sol de Mazatlán		Mazatlán	
El Sol de México		Mexico City	
El Sol de Morelia		Morelia, Michoacán	
El Sol de Nayarit		Tepic, Nayarit	
El Sol de Puebla		Puebla	
El Sol de San Luis		San Luis Potosí	
El Sol de Sinaloa		Culiacán, Sinaloa	
El Sol de Tampico		Tamaulipas	
El Sol de Tijuana		Tijuana, Baja California	
El Sol de Tlaxcala		Tlaxcala	
El Sol de Toluca		Toluca	
El Sol de Zacatecas		Zacatecas	
El Sol de Zamora		Zamora, Michoacán	
El Sol del Bajío		Celaya, Guanajuato	
El Sol del Centro		Aguascalientes	
Sol del Sur		Tamaulipas	
El Sudcaliforniano		La Paz, Baja California Sur	
El Sur		Acapulco, Guerrero	
El Sur de Campeche		Campeche	
Tabasco Hoy		Villahermosa, Tabasco	
Tiempo	Daily	Chihuahua	
El Tiempo de Durango		Durango, Durango	
Tribuna de los Cabos		San José del Cabo, Baja California Sur	
Tribuna del Yaqui		Sonora	
Última Hora		Nuevo Laredo	
Unión Cancún		Cancún, Quintana Roo	
La Unión de Morelos		Cuernavaca, Morelos	
El Universal			
El Universal Querétaro		Querétaro	
Unión Guanajuato		Guanajuato	
Unión Jalisco		Jalisco	
Unión Puebla		Puebla	
Unión Yucatán		Yucatán	
Unomásuno		Mexico City	
Vanguardia		Coahuila	
El Vigía (Ensenada)		Ensenada, Baja California	
El Vigía (Guaymas)		Guaymas, Sonora	
VivirAquí	Weekly		
La Voz de la Frontera		Baja California Norte	
La Voz de Michoacán		Morelia, Michoacán	
La Voz de Monclova		Monclova, Coahuila De Zaragoza	
La Voz de Piedras Negras		Piedras Negras, Coahuila	
El Zócalo		Piedras Negras, Monclova, Acuña, Coahuila	

== Defunct newspapers ==
- La Abeja de Chilpancingo
- Alkartu (1942–1947)
- The American Star
- La Chinaca
- Clamores
- El Colmillo Público
- Correo Americano del Sur
- El Demócrata Sinaloense (1919–1999)
- L'Echo français (1902–1925)
- El Despertador Americano
- El Diario de Los Mochis
- Diario de México
- Diario del Hogar (1881–1914), founded by Filomeno Mata
- Diario Monitor (2004–2009)
- Don Simplicio (1845–1847)
- Gaceta de México (1722–1739)
- El Hijo del Ahuizote (1885–1903)
- El Ilustrador Americano
- El Ilustrador Nacional
- El Imparcial (1896–1914), established by Rafael Reyes Spíndola
- Madera
- México Nuevo
- El Monitor Republicano (1846–1896), founded by Vicente García Torres
- Mujer Moderna
- El Mundo Ilustrado (1894–1914)
- El Museo Yucateco (1841–1842)
- Novedades de México, Mexico City
- La Orquesta (1861–1877)
- El Pensador Mexicano
- Regeneración
- Revista de Mérida
- Revista de Yucatán
- Semanario de las señoritas mexicanas
- Semanario Patriótico Americano (1812–1813)
- El Siglo Diez y Nueve (1841–1858)
- El Sol (1821–1824)
- El Sol de Guadalajara (1948–2015)
- Tribuna Campeche (1975–2025)
- Vésper
- Violetas del Anáhuac (1887–1889)

== See also ==
- Journalism in Mexico
- Proceso (magazine)
- Freedom of the press in Mexico
- Censorship in Mexico
- Media of Mexico

=== Notable journalists and writers ===
- Carmen Aristegui
- Julio Scherer García
- Elena Poniatowska
- Lydia Cacho
- Anabel Hernández
- Javier Valdez Cárdenas
- Francisco Ortiz Franco
- Miroslava Breach
- Regina Martínez Pérez
- Andrés Roemer
- Ángeles Mastretta
- Tamara De Anda
- es:Jenaro Villamil

=== Related topics ===
- Category:Mexican journalists
- Mexico News Daily
- Violence against journalists in Mexico
- List of journalists and media workers killed in Mexico
- Committee to Protect Journalists
- Radio in Mexico
- Television in Mexico
- List of Mexican writers
