= El Porvenir (newspaper) =

Mexican daily newspaper

- Type: Daily newspaper
- Format: Broadsheet
- Founded: 1919; 106 years ago
- Headquarters: Monterrey, Nuevo León
- Website: elporvenir.mx

El Porvenir (The Future) is an independent daily newspaper based in the city of Monterrey, Nuevo León, founded in 1919.

The average daily circulation of this morning daily is 18,400 copies. This makes it the third largest daily newspaper in the state of Nuevo León, behind El Norte and Milenio.

== History ==
The newspaper was founded on January 31, 1919 by Neoleon businessman Jesús Cantú Leal (Cadereyta Jiménez, Nuevo León, September 18, 1877 - Monterrey, March 26, 1947), Eduardo Martínez Celis, Federico Gómez, and Colombian poet Miguel Ángel Osorio Benítez (1883-1942), better known by his heteronym Porfirio Barba-Jacob, who retired two months later.

The company had been established in January 1919, during the final stages of the Mexican Revolution; in the following years, Mexico would need to heal the wounds of that civil war, and the population would need to reflect, to set its sights on the future. Also, the First World War was 81 days old. Its first issue had the seven-column title: "El Hambre y la Desnudez de las clases humildes deben tener un Próximo Fin" (The Hunger and the Nakedness of the Humble Classes Must Have a Coming End).

Upon Cantú Leal's death, his son Rogelio Cantú Gómez (February 26, 1917 - August 29, 1984), known as "El Gerente" ("The Manager"), took over the editorial and administrative reins of the business. Cantú Gómez had started working at the newspaper at the age of 16, in 1933.

In the first days of May 1934, the Asociación de Editores de los Estados (AEE) was created, co-founded by six newspapers: El Siglo de Torreón, whose general manager Antonio de Juambelz was its first president; El Dictamen de Veracruz, Diario de Yucatán, El Porvenir, El Mundo de Tampico and El Informador de Guadalajara. A characteristic phrase of this Monterrey newspaper is: "If you read it in El Porvenir, it's true!" The third and fourth generations of the Cantú family continue at the helm of the publishing house.

== Present day ==
The newspaper is headed by José Gerardo Cantú Escalante, the grandson of the founder. The newspaper utilizes news services from various agencies including Notimex, SUN (El Universal news agency), La Jornada, and MEXSPORT. It features twelve sections, covering topics ranging from national and international news to sports, culture, and opinion. El Porvenir is highly regarded for its content, as evidenced by the inclusion of columnists from national newspapers such as Marcela Gómez Zalce and Mario Maldonado.

== See also ==
- List of newspapers in Mexico
