= Diario del Sur =

Diario del Sur may refer to:

- Diario del Sur (Tapachula), a Mexican newspaper published in Tapachula, Chiapas
- Diario del Sur (Pasto), a Colombian newspaper published in San Juan de Pasto, Nariño
