= El Occidental =

- Type: Daily newspaper
- Owner: Organización Editorial Mexicana
- Founder: Rubén Villa Michel
- Founded: August 5, 1942
- Language: Spanish
- OCLC number: 5350682
- Website: www.eloccidental.com.mx

El Occidental is a Mexican newspaper founded on August 5, 1942, in the city of Guadalajara.

== History ==
El Occidental was an initiative of Ruben Villa Michel, who was also its first manager. The aim of the new journal was to create a competitor to Jalisco's oldest newspaper, El Informador. To fund the newspaper, Villa Michel received financial support from entrepreneurs such as Jorge Dipp, Carlos Dávalos, Mauricio Brun, Luis Aranguren and the archbishop monsignor José Garibi y Rivera. Journalist Restituto Herrador Calvo became the first director of the newspaper. Within weeks of having established El Occidental, Villa Michel, invited the well known journalist José Pagés Llergo, intending to strengthen the paper. Pagés moved to Guadalajara and became director of the newspaper. However, this only lasted a few months, as Pagés considered Guadalajara too small for him, he also came into conflict with the entrepreneurial-Christian ideology of proprietors and backers of the newspaper.

The newspaper was initially not financially profitable. According to journalist Pedro Vázquez Cisneros who became director of the paper in 1944, it was not until 1946 and 1947 that the paper "produced profits," which turned out to be very short lived. Given the financial crisis of the paper, it was acquired by Coronel José García Valseca in October 1948, and was thus absorbed into what would become the Cadena García Valseca (The García Valseca Chain). This acquisition was done despite García Valseca being advised that he was "purchasing a corpse." Nevertheless, García Valseca purchased it, resurrected it, and launched it as the main competitor for El Informador, as equally serious and conservative.

The Cadena García Valseca newspapers were initially highly conservative, supporting the corporate sector, the Catholic Church and omitting all popular leftist movements. Nonetheless, after 1968 the newspapers started becoming relatively more open to social movements. The Cadena García Valseca continued to expand to become the largest journalist consortium in Mexico, and in the Spanish speaking world. However, due to an increasing debt of 400 million pesos, it was sold, and became the Organización Editorial Mexicana under the proprietors.

== See also ==
- List of newspapers in Mexico
