= Romero Rubio metro station =

Mexico City Metro station

Romero Rubio
- Station platforms, 2026

General information
- Location: Avenida Oceanía; Venustiano Carranza, Mexico City; Mexico
- Coordinates: 19°26′27″N 99°05′40″W
- System: Mexico City Metro
- Owner: Government of Mexico City
- Operator: Sistema de Transporte Colectivo (STC)
- Platforms: 2 side platforms
- Tracks: 2
- Connections: Routes: 10-B, 18; Various local service routes

Construction
- Structure type: Elevated
- Accessible: Partial

Other information
- Status: In service

History
- Opened: 15 December 1999; 26 years ago

Passengers
- 2025: 5,092,619 (Note: The system's website counts only passenger entries into stations and does not include passengers passing through, transferring between lines, or exiting the station. The data here is limited to the most recent ten years to avoid excessive listings; earlier figures can be found in this page's history or on the Mexico City Metro website. To calculate the average daily ridership, the annual total is divided by 365 days (366 in leap years), with decimals omitted from the result. Each station per line is ranked individually, as the system counts transfer stations separately. The percentage change is calculated automatically using the data from the current year and the previous year.) ▼2.68%
- Rank: 101/195

Services
Preceding station	Mexico City Metro	Following station
Oceanía toward Ciudad Azteca	Line B	Ricardo Flores Magón toward Buenavista
Route map
Location
- Location within Mexico City
- Area map

Romero Rubio metro station (Note: Estación del Metro Romero Rubio. Spanish pronunciation: [roˈmeɾo ˈruβjo].) is a station of the Mexico City Metro in the city's borough of Venustiano Carranza. It is an elevated railway stop with two side platforms serving Line B (Green-and-Gray Line), between Oceanía and Ricardo Flores Magón. It was opened on 15 December 1999, providing service north toward Villa de Aragón and southwest toward Buenavista.

Romero Rubio metro station services the colonias (neighborhoods) of Moctezuma and Romero Rubio, along Avenida Oceanía. Additionally, it has served the Encuentro Oceanía shopping center since 2021. The station's name references the colonia of the same name, named after Manuel Romero Rubio, who served as Secretary of the Interior from 1884 to 1895. Its pictogram depicts the silhouette of his bust. The facilities offer partial accessibility for people with disabilities, including tactile paving and braille signage.

In 2025, Romero Rubio station had an average daily ridership of 13,952 passenger entries, ranking it the 101st busiest stops in the network. The building's area has experienced subsidence issues.

== Location and layout ==
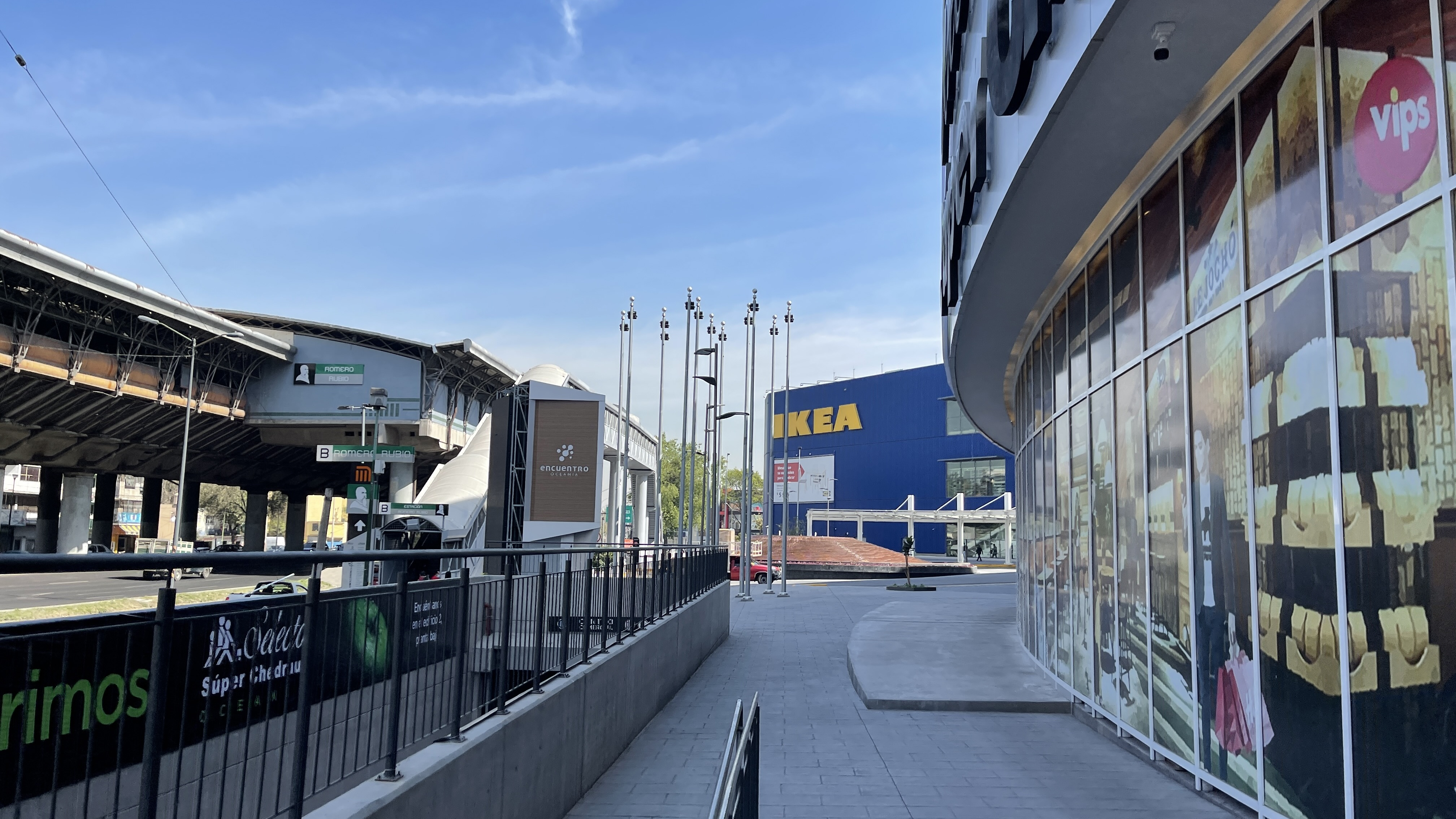
Romero Rubio metro station is located along Oceanía Avenue adjacent to the Encuentro Oceanía shopping mall (right).

Romero Rubio is an elevated metro station on Line B on Avenida Oceanía, in the Colonias ("neighborhoods"), Moctezuma and Romero Rubio, in the Venustiano Carranza borough, northeastern Mexico City.

Romero Rubio metro station has two exits. The northern exit is at the corner of Avenida del Peñón and Calle Oriente 158 in Colonia Moctezuma and the southern one is at Calle Marruecos in Colonia Romero Rubio. The building offers provides partial accessibility for people with disabilities, including tactile paving and braille signage. The Encuentro Oceanía shopping center, which opened in 2021, is adjacent to the station and was the first major shopping center to open in the borough. Metro authorities considered adding elevators and wheelchair ramps following the construction of Encuentro Oceanía.

The station is located between Oceanía and Ricardo Flores Magón stations on the line. The area is serviced by Routes 10-B and 18 of the Red de Transporte de Pasajeros bus network.

== History and construction ==
Line B of the Mexico City Metro was built by Empresas ICA. The first section opened on 15 December 1999, running from Buenavista to Villa de Aragón. The stretch between Romero Rubio and Oceanía spans 809 meters (2,654 ft), while the segment toward Ricardo Flores Magón measures 908 meters (2,979 ft).

=== Name and pictogram ===
The station's pictogram features the silhouette of Manuel Romero Rubio, who served as the country's Secretary of the Interior from 1884 to 1895.

=== Incidents ===
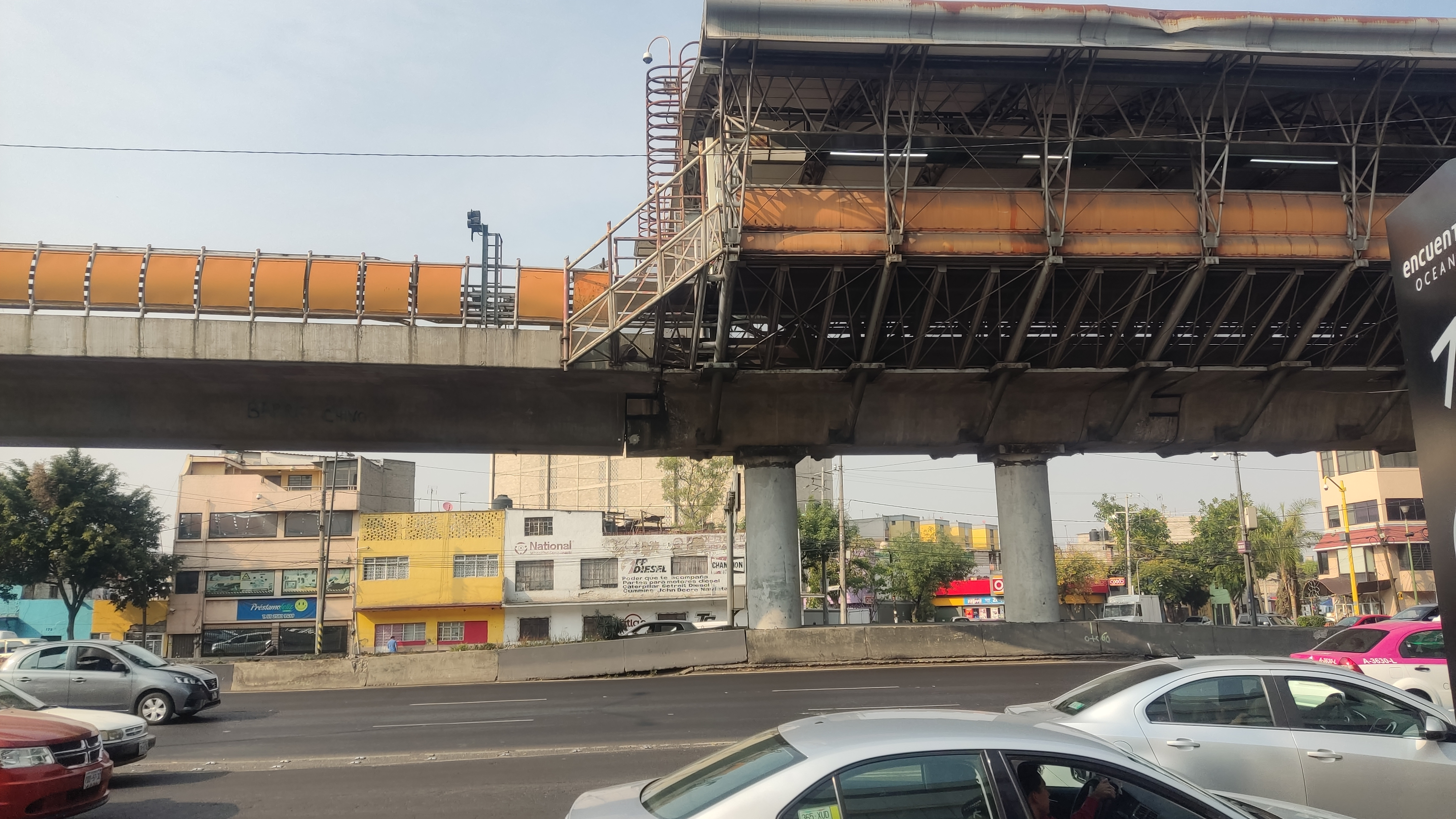
In 2022, the southbound header of the station showed an apparent difference in level (in the middle). Authorities reported that it does not pose a problem for operations.

From 23 April to 28 June 2020, the station was temporarily closed due to the COVID-19 pandemic in Mexico.

Romero Rubio metro station has experienced subsidence issues. Israel Zamarrón of El Sol de México reported sinking and vibrations caused by trains and heavy vehicles passing beneath it. In July 2022, commuters observed that part of the structure was uneven. System authorities inspected it and confirmed that it was safe, noting that it is under continuous monitoring. From January to September 2024, overnight repairs were carried out on the line's elevated stations, including Romero Rubio, to realign and regrade the tracks.

== Ridership ==
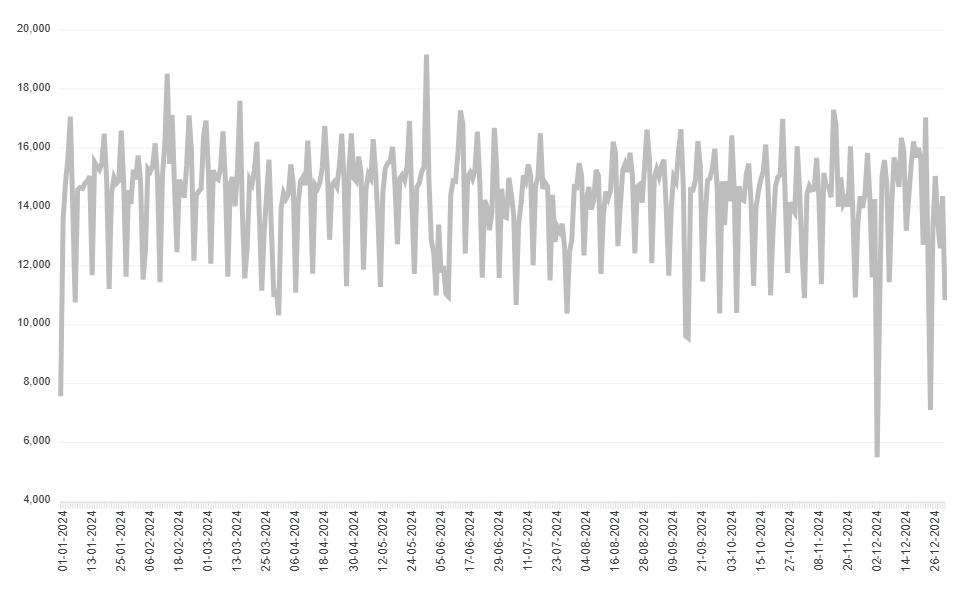
Daily ridership for Romero Rubio station in 2024

According to official data, before the impact of the COVID-19 pandemic, the station recorded between 7,800 and 8,300 average daily entries from 2016 to 2019. In 2025, it recorded 5,092,619 passenger entries, ranking 101st among the system's 195 stations.

Annual passenger ridership
Year	Ridership	Average daily	Rank	% change	Ref.
2025	5,092,619	13,952	101/195	−2.68%	
2024	5,233,057	14,297	85/195	+7.18%	
2023	4,882,287	13,376	97/195	+24.10%	
2022	3,934,214	10,778	110/195	+74.31%	
2021	2,257,035	6,183	130/195	+31.78%	
2020	1,712,731	4,679	160/195	−41.45%	
2019	2,925,132	8,014	167/195	+2.17%	
2018	2,863,109	7,844	168/195	−4.93%	
2017	3,011,671	8,251	162/195	+0.35%	
2016	3,001,060	8,199	163/195	−8.83%	
