= Montes Movie Theater fire =

1941 building fire in Guadalajara, Mexico

- Date: 6 July 1941
- Time: About 6:30 p.m.
- Location: Guadalajara, Jalisco, Mexico; 20°40′56″N 103°21′11″W
- Cause: Ignition of screen due to a lightning strike
- Deaths: 86
- Injuries: 11

City of Guadalajara

The Montes Movie Theater fire occurred on 6 July 1941, at the Montes Movie Theater in Guadalajara, Jalisco, Mexico, resulting in 86 deaths and eleven injured. The fire destroyed the relatively small building.

The theater was located on Mezquitán Street between Angulo and Herrera y Cairo, the present location of the Jardín del Refugio (Garden of the Refuge), in downtown Guadalajara. At the time of the fire, 2,500 people were crowded into the theater.

The fire originated after lightning struck the stage or screen. Much of the audience was frightened when seeing the flames and stampeded towards the doors, which led to the deaths of 86 (Note: UPI reported 87 deaths) people who were trampled, crushed, or asphyxiated. Eleven others survived with injuries. People in the gallery had to escape by running down two flights of stairs.

According to United Press International reports published in United States newspapers, a crowd of three thousand people formed the next day at the city hospital seeking to identify the victims. Thirty-seven women and sixteen children were among the dead.

According to an advertisement in the Sunday, 6 July 1941 edition of the Guadalajaran daily newspaper El Informador, the theater was showing Bulldog Drummond's Revenge (1937) and La vuelta del Charro Negro (The return of the Black Charro) (1941).
