= Diary (disambiguation) =

A diary is a form of personal journal.

Diary may also refer to:

- Diary (stationery), a small book with a space for each day of the year with room for notes
- Project diary, or log

== Arts, entertainment, and media ==
=== Films ===
- Diary (1975 film), a West German film directed by Rudolf Thome
- Diary (1983 film), an Israeli-British film
- Diary (2006 film), a Cantonese-language thriller film directed by Oxide Pang
- The Diary (1974 film), a Yugoslavian cartoon
- Diary (2009 film), Telugu language psychological thriller film

=== Albums ===
- Diary (Thelma Aoyama album), 2008
- Diary (Sunny Day Real Estate album), 1994
- Diary (Shiori Takei album), 2007
- Diary (Ralph Towner album), 1973
- The Diary (J Dilla album), 2016
- The Diary (Scarface album), 1994
- The Diary (The Gentle Storm album), 2015
- The Diary (You Think You Know), a 2003 unreleased album by Charli Baltimore

=== Songs ===
- "Diary" (Charli Baltimore song)
- "Diary" (Bread song), 1972
- "Diary" (Tino Coury song), 2010
- "Diary" (Alicia Keys song), 2003
- "Diary", a song by Aya Matsuura from the album T.W.O
- "Diary", a song by Gugudan from Act.1 The Little Mermaid
- "Diary", a song by Wale from the album Attention Deficit
- "Diary", a song by Weyes Blood from the album Front Row Seat to Earth
- "The Diary" (song), a 1958 song by Neil Sedaka
- "The Diary", a song by Funeral for a Friend from the album Tales Don't Tell Themselves
- "The Diary", a song by Hollywood Undead from the album Swan Songs

=== Television ===
- Diary (American TV series), a series on MTV, showing the daily life of an artist
- Diary (Maldivian TV series), a 2010 romantic drama television mini-series
- Diary, a television ident for BBC Two, see BBC Two '1991–2001' idents
- "The Diary" (Adventure Time), a 2015 episode of the animated series Adventure Time
- "The Diary", a 2026 episode of the anime Mushoku Tensei

=== Other uses in arts, entertainment, and media ===
- Diary (novel), a novel by Chuck Palahniuk
- El Diario (disambiguation), the name of many Spanish-language newspapers

== See also ==
- Logbook, a record of data relating to a ship or submarine
