= Eduardo Martínez =

Eduardo Martínez may refer to:

- Eduardo Martínez (volleyball), Argentine volleyball player
- Eduardo Martinez (politician), American politician
- Eduardo Martínez Celis, Mexican journalist, author and politician
- Eduardo Martínez Somalo, Spanish prelate of the Catholic Church
