= Official Journal =

Official Journal may refer to the public journal of several nations and other political organizations:

- Belgian Official Journal
- Journal Officiel de la République Française
- Official Journal of the European Patent Office
- Official Journal of the European Union

== See also ==
- Diario Oficial (disambiguation)
