= Carmen Romero Rubio =

First Lady of Mexico from 1884 to 1911

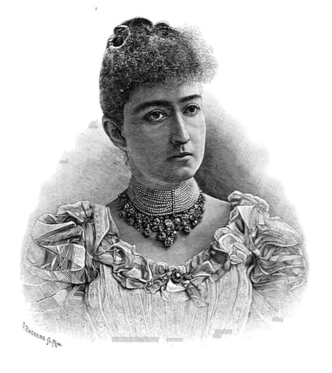

First Lady of Mexico
- In role 1 December 1884 – 25 May 1911
- President: Porfirio Díaz
- Preceded by: Laura Mantecón Arteaga
- Succeeded by: Refugio Borneque

Personal details
- Born: 20 January 1864 Tula, Tamaulipas, Mexico
- Died: 25 June 1944 (aged 80) Mexico City, D.F., Mexico
- Spouse: Porfirio Díaz (m. 1881; died 1915)
- Parent(s): Manuel Romero Rubio; Agustina Castelló Rivas

Fabiana Sebastiana María Carmen Romero Rubio y Castelló (20 January 1864 – 25 June 1944), was the second wife of Porfirio Díaz, President of Mexico.

== Youth ==
Carmen Romero Rubio was born on 20 January 1864 in Tula, Tamaulipas to a wealthy family. Her parents were prominent liberal politician and lawyer Manuel Romero Rubio, and Agustina Castelló. Her godfather was Sebastián Lerdo de Tejada. She had two sisters, María Luisa (Luisa) and Sofia (Chofa). Known as "Carmelita," she celebrated her saint's day on the feast of the Virgin of Mt. Carmel, on 16 July. Her friends and family members organized festivals in her honor in Carmelite convents during her lifetime.

== Marriage ==
Carmen's father, Manuel Romero Rubio, was active in Mexican politics since 1854 with his participation in the Plan of Ayutla to his death in 1895, when he was the Secretary of the Interior of Porfirio Díaz. He was also a prominent figure of the governments of Benito Juárez and Lerdo de Tejada, and participated in the formulation of the Constitution of 1857, which separated the functions of the Catholic Church and the State.

Since 1870, the house of the Romero Rubio family became one of the most important political centers of Mexico.

The Rubios were acquaintances, and frequent guests, of the American ambassador, John W. Foster. It was during a reception at the American embassy that General Porfirio Díaz met Carmen Romero Rubio. She agreed to teach him English, and a closer relationship evolved. On 5 November 1881, don Porfirio married Carmen Romero Rubio in a civil ceremony, with the President of Mexico Manuel González serving as witness, according to the new secular Reform Laws. The next day, the religious ceremony took place. The couple received the blessing of Archbishop Antonio de Labastida y Dávalos. They honeymooned in the United States, traveling across the country, using the opportunity to establish important contacts with American politicians and businessmen whom Díaz hoped would invest in Mexico.

This marriage derived from the consolidation of a political alliance between various liberal factions that still did not accept the Porfiriato and Porfirio Díaz, through the intermediation of Manuel Romero Rubio - Carmelita's father -, who had excellent relationships with various political circles and a great capacity for negotiation and conciliation.

On the other hand, the apocryphal memoirs of Sebastián Lerdo de Tejada stress the importance of her mother—and not Carmen—in aiding Díaz's relations with the Church.

== First Lady of Mexico ==
A year and a half after the death of Delfina Ortega, first wife of General Porfirio Díaz, Carmen Romero Rubio succeeded her in the role of First Lady of the Nation.

Romero Rubio modeled her activities as First Lady on the traditional role of rulers' wives. In Mexico, the Spanish vicereine had long been the patron of religious and social affairs, and this role had been expanded by empress Carlota during her brief reign, to include the protection of the arts and the encouragement of social reforms. Carmen expanded on this, accompanying Díaz at public events. Her copious correspondence was managed by a special department of the President's office and she helped to host visiting personages. She attended religious, civic, and cultural events. Working with the wives of cabinet members, governors, and regional oligarchs, she formed and chaired relief committees responding to natural disasters. Her work on behalf of the children of working class women in the nation's capital established a number of day care centers, schools, and benevolent associations, including "La Casa Amiga de la Obrera" founded in 1887.

She also saw to the upbringing of Díaz's children, arranging marriages to prominent families. Rubio Romero served as First Lady for three decades, from when Diaz took office on 1 December 1884 until his resignation on 25 May 1911.

== The exile, return, last years and death ==
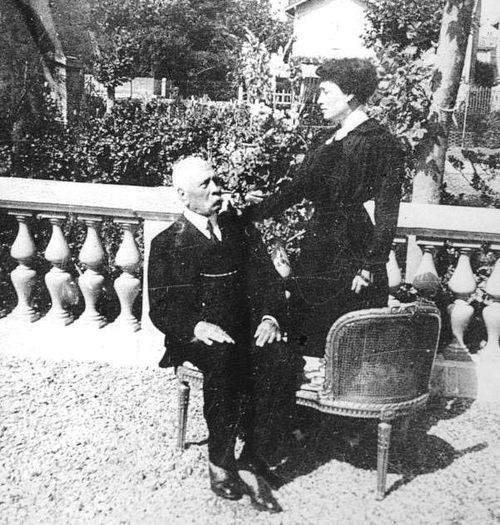
In Paris, c. 1912

Carmelita accompanied her husband in his exile to France in 1911. They lived in Paris in rented apartments, never buying a home, frequently moving and traveling. They toured Europe and visited Egypt. After the general's death in 1915, Carmen remained in France for nearly two decades, living from investments in Mexican oil companies and rental income. She played an important role in the rituals of the Mexican colony in Paris, organizing memorial masses for Díaz and for the feast of the Virgin of Guadalupe. Carmelita spent much of her time traveling around France and Spain, and frequently summered at her stepson Porfirio's chateau de Moulins, close to Landes-le-Gaulois. Carmen returned to Mexico in 1934, accompanied by her sister Chofa aboard the French steamer "Mexique." She resided for some time in Mexico City's Colonia Roma, on Tonalá Street, in a home that belonged to her niece Teresa Castelló.

On 25 June 1944, Carmen Romero Rubio y Castelló died in Mexico City at eighty years of age. She was buried at the Panteón Francés (French Cemetery), and the mass was officiated by the Archbishop Luis María Martínez. Salvador Novo wrote an excellent chronicle of her funeral.
