= Frontera (Tijuana) =

- A Frontera front page
- Type: Daily newspaper
- Founded: 1999

Frontera is a daily newspaper that serves the San Diego–Tijuana metropolitan area. It was founded in 1999 under an alliance between the Crónica of Mexicali and El Imparcial of Hermosillo. It has recently converted from a broadsheet to a tabloid.

== See also ==
- List of newspapers in Mexico
