= Gringo Gazette =

- Cover of the May 14, 2007 issue
- Frequency: bi-weekly
- Format: Journal, magazine
- Founder: Carrie Duncan
- First issue: 1995; 31 years ago
- Country: United States, Mexico
- Based in: Baja California/Baja California Sur, Mexico
- Language: English
- Website: Official Website

The Gringo Gazette is an English-language newspaper founded by Carrie Duncan, published every other week for the American immigrant communities in Baja California and Baja California Sur, Mexico. It has been published since 1995. Most of its contributors are Americans living in Mexico or Americans with a second home in Mexico. Most of the subscribers of this newspaper are located in San Felipe, La Paz and Cabo San Lucas.

The Gringo Gazette North is the Baja California edition of the Gringo Gazette and distributes to Rosarito Beach, Ensenada and other nearby towns on the Gold Coast.

== See also ==
- List of newspapers in Mexico
