= My Press =

- Format: Compact
- Owner(s): Sergio Cara; Pedro Basilio
- Founder(s): Sergio Cara; Pedro Basilio
- Editor: Lidia Rivera
- Founded: January 12, 2016; 9 years ago (as My Press Zone)
- Headquarters: Av. Insurgentes Sur 1752, Oficina 301 CP. 01030 Mexico City
- Country: Mexico
- Circulation: Monthly
- Website: www.mypress.mx

My Press is a Mexican newspaper founded in Mexico City by Sergio Cara and Pedro Basilio in December 2015, but it was not formally constituted until January 12, 2016. It debuted as a print medium in Mexico City on October 1, 2016.

It is distributed in its free printed version in 80 key areas of the capital such as Santa Fe and Polanco, as well as in the VIP waiting rooms in the Benito Juárez International Airport of Mexico City. Its digital version is updated daily through its official website.

The edition of the newspaper is printed monthly and has 16 color pages. According to its own founder, My Press was born as a printed media making use of digital strategies, being one of the few that use this hybrid model.

According to the Mexican newspaper 20 Minutos, My Press differs from other newspapers like Publimetro, 24 Horas, EstiloDF and MásporMás for its focus on news and business targeted to Generation X and Millennials.

== See also ==
- List of newspapers in Mexico
