= Encuentro Oceanía =

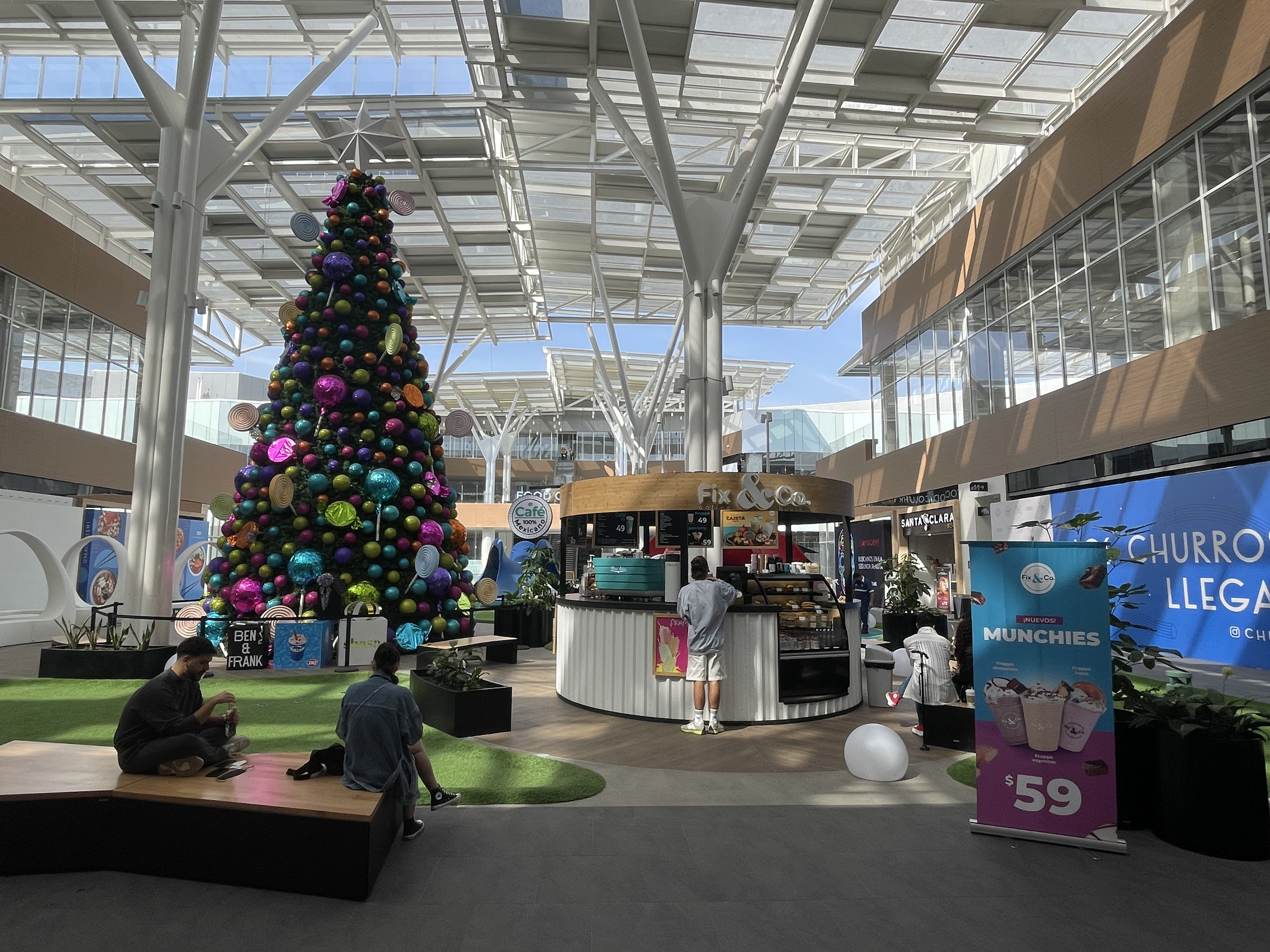
- Address: Av. del Peñón 355, Moctezuma 2da Secc, Venustiano Carranza
- Opened: 2021
- Num. of stores: >200
- Num. of anchor tenants: 5
- Floor area: 75,000 square meters (810,000 sq ft)
- Public transit: Romero Rubio metro station
- Website: encuentrooceania.com

Encuentro Oceanía is a super-regional mall in the Venustiano Carranza borough of Mexico City, around 5 km east of the Zócalo. It is located along the main thoroughfare, Avenida Oceanía, around 1 km west of the Circuito Interior inner ring highway, and around 2 km west of Terminal 1 of the Mexico City International Airport. It is across the street from Romero Rubio metro station.

Anchor stores include the first IKEA store in Mexico, which opened in April 2021. The store measures 23,000 square meters (250,000 sq ft) across 3 levels with entrances off all 3 floors of the mall.

Other anchors include Chedraui hypermarkets, Cinemex multicinemas, Energy Fitness, and Forever 21. The center as a whole held its soft launch in October, 2021. There is a total of over 200 stores and 75,000 square meters (810,000 sq ft) leasable area. The center cost around 1.5 billion Mexican pesos to build, according to its spokesman.

== Gallery ==
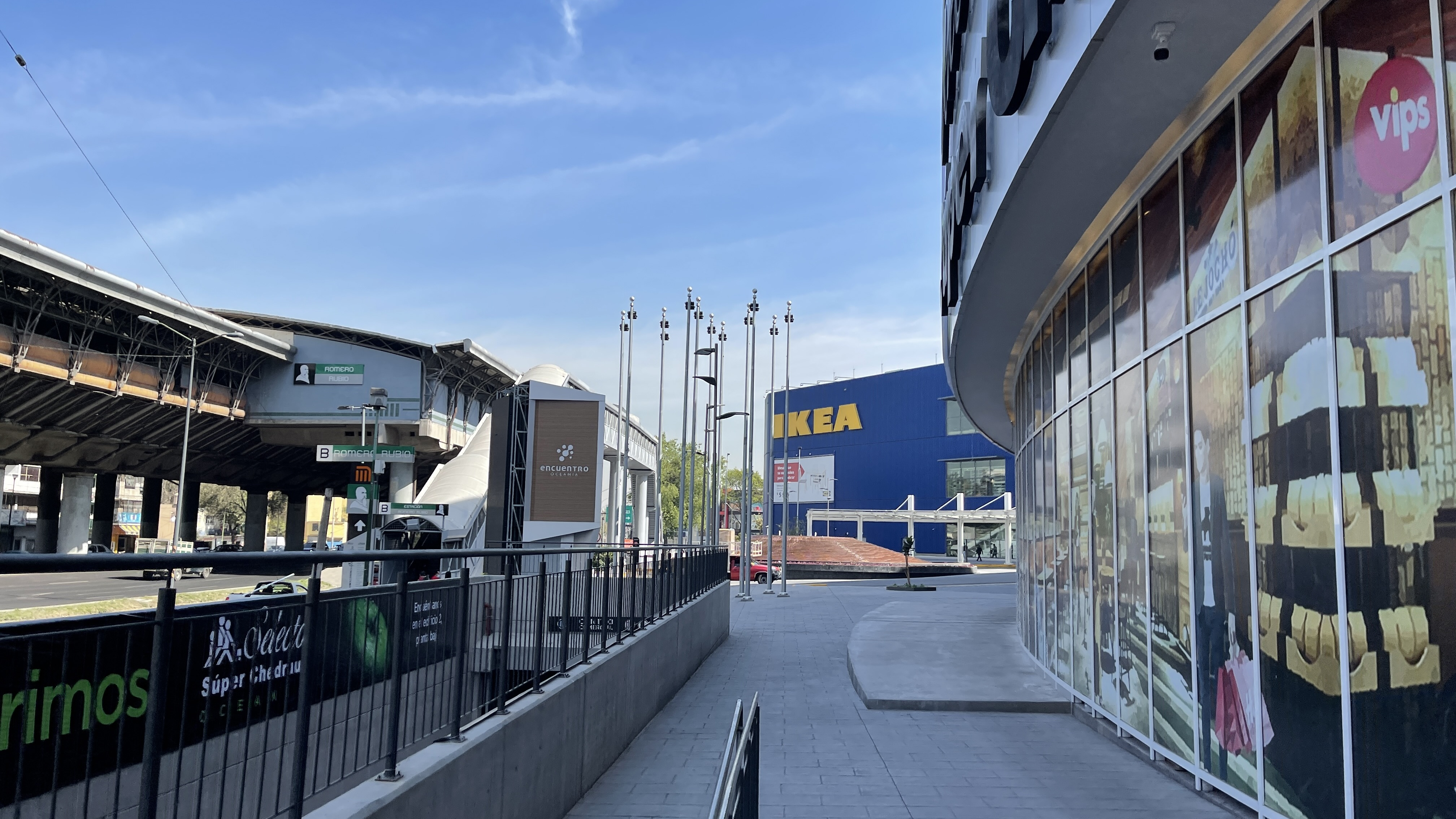
Northwestern façade along Avenida Oceanía

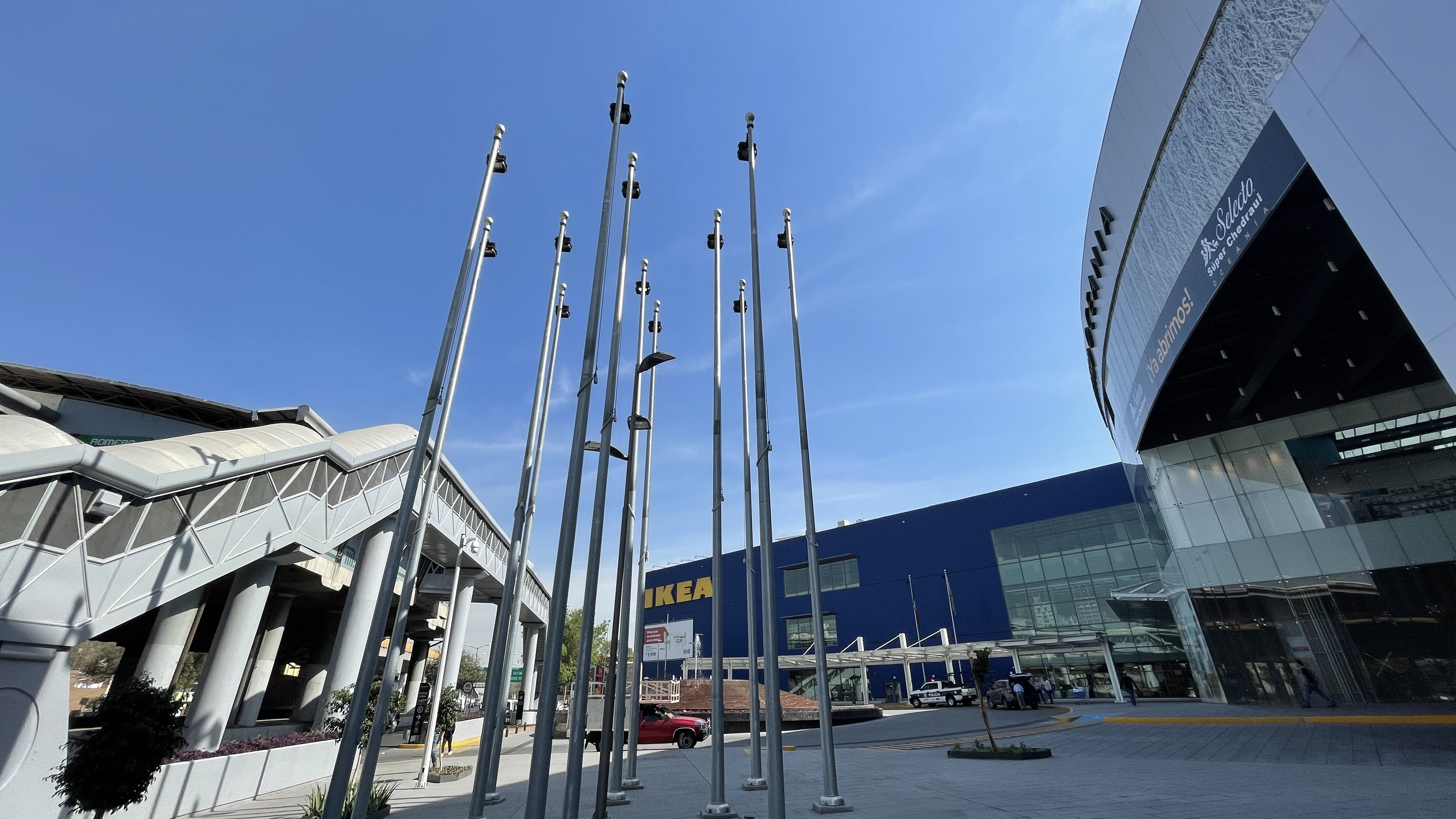
Closeup of the fountain, Romero Rubio metro station entrance, and IKEA

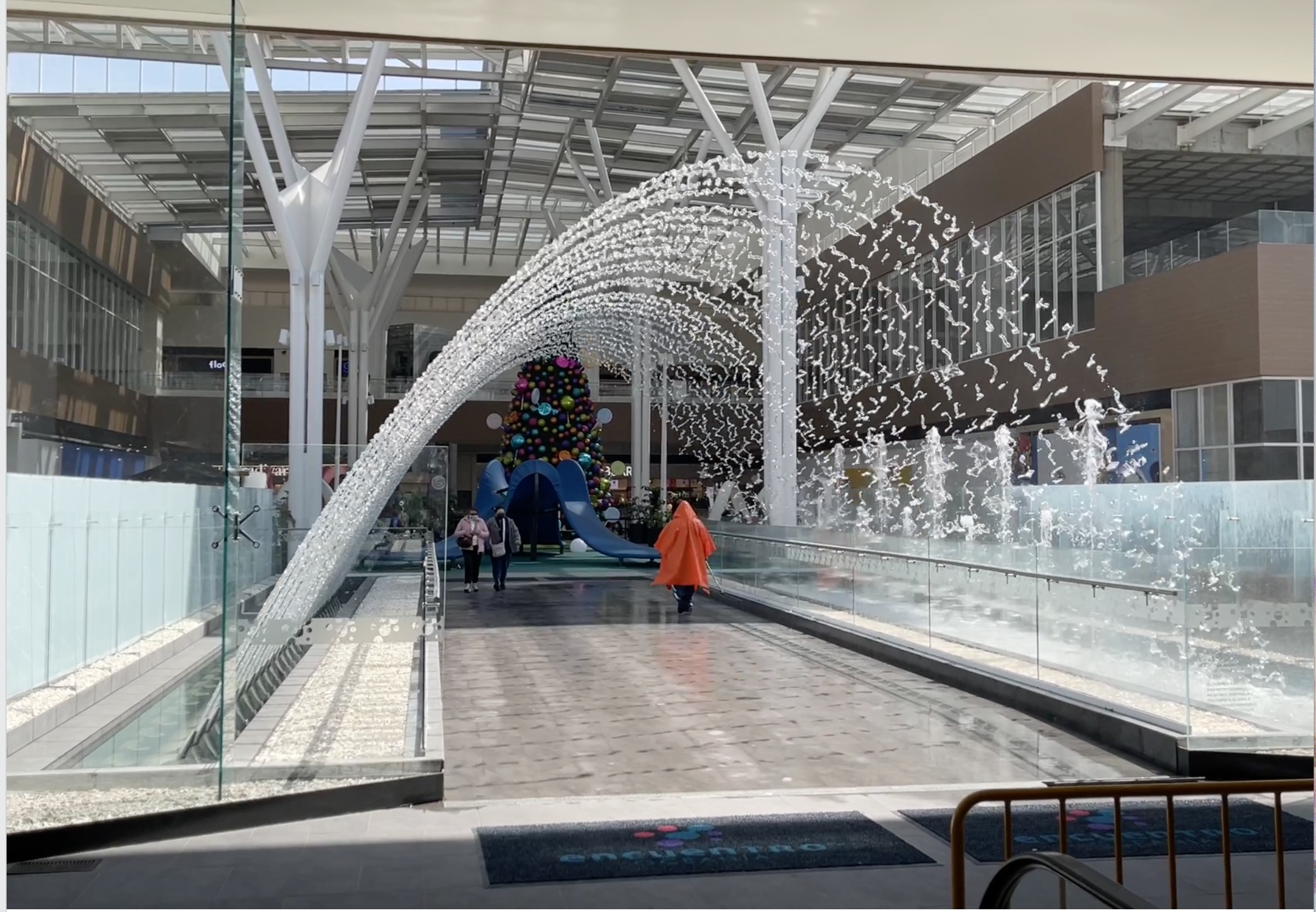
Bridge with fountain

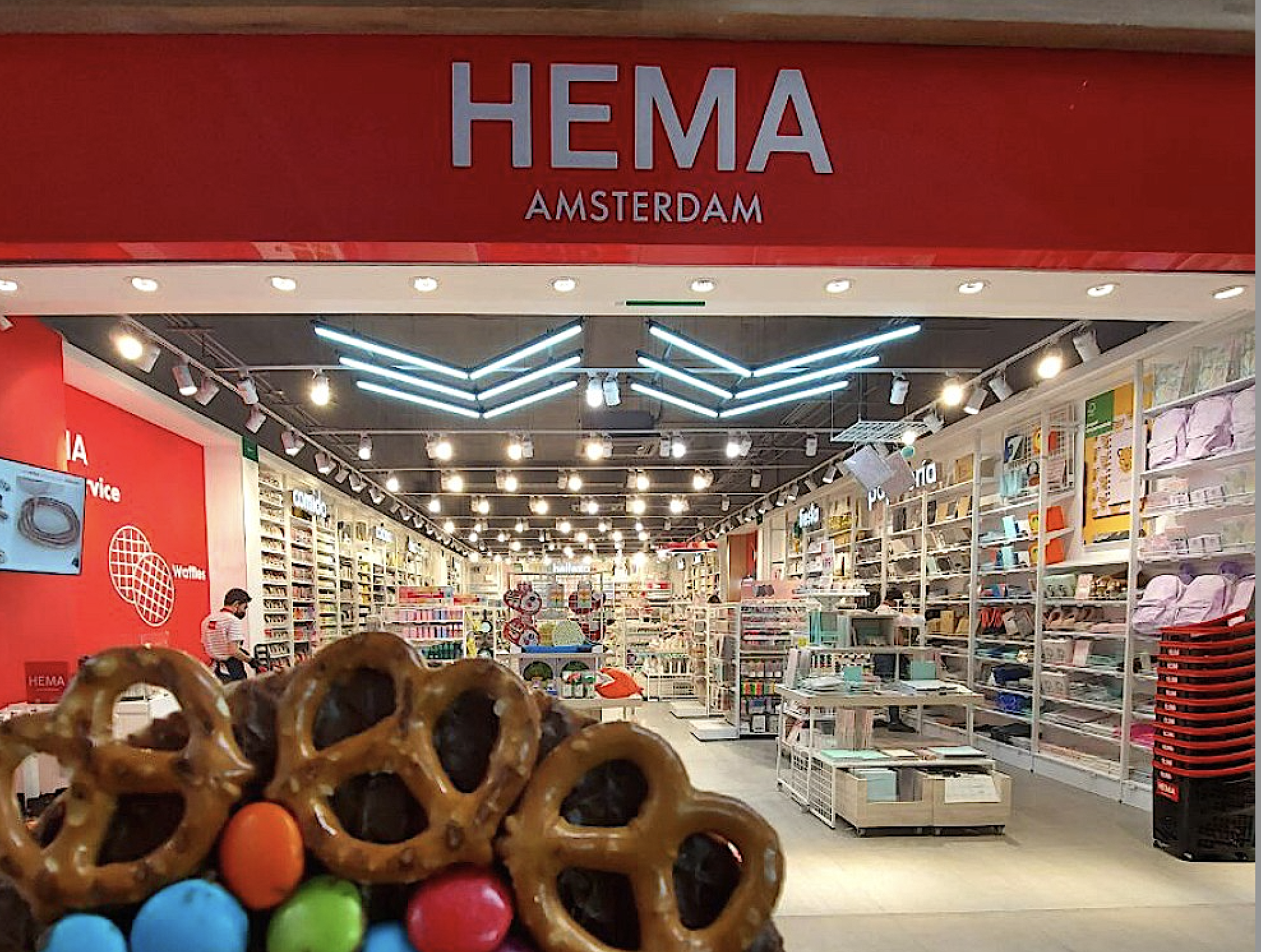
Dutch-owned HEMA variety store
