= La Voz de Michoacán =

- Type: Daily newspaper
- Format: Tabloid
- Publisher: La Voz de Michoacán S.A. de C.V.
- Editor: Álvaro Media
- Founded: 19 June 1948
- Language: Spanish
- Headquarters: Morelia, Mexico
- Circulation: Regional

La Voz de Michoacán is one of the leading daily newspapers in Michoacán, Mexico. It was established on 19 June 1948 by José Tocavén Lavín. The current editor is Jorge Manzo Méndez.

== See also ==
- List of newspapers in Mexico
