= Manuel Romero Rubio =

Mexican politician and lawyer

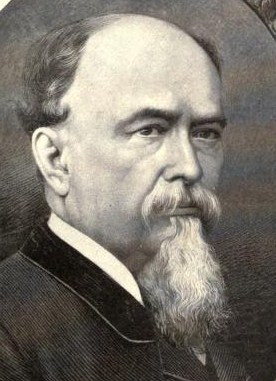

Secretary of the Interior
- In office December 1, 1884 – October 3, 1895
- President: Porfirio Díaz
- Preceded by: Carlos Díez Gutiérrez
- Succeeded by: Manuel González Cossío

Secretary of Foreign Affairs
- In office August 31, 1876 – November 20, 1876
- President: Sebastián Lerdo de Tejada
- Preceded by: Juan de Dios Arias
- Succeeded by: Guillermo Prieto

Personal details
- Born: March 7, 1828 Mexico City, D.F., Mexico
- Died: October 3, 1895 (aged 67) Mexico City, D.F., Mexico
- Party: Liberal
- Spouse: Agustina Castelló Rivas
- Children: Carmen Romero Rubio Castelló inter alia
- Occupation: Politician, lawyer

Manuel Romero Rubio (Mexico City, March 7, 1828 – Mexico City, October 3, 1895) was a Mexican politician and lawyer who participated in the governments of Benito Juárez, Sebastián Lerdo de Tejada and Porfirio Díaz.

== Education as a lawyer and the beginning of his political career ==
Manuel Romero Rubio began his education at the Conciliar Seminary in Mexico City, where he acquired knowledge of Latin grammar and philosophy. Later, at the Colegio de San Gregorio he began his studies in law. In there, he was recognized as one of the most distinguished students and became friends with Lerdo de Tejada, among other colleagues who later acquired highly relevant roles in the national political sphere.

At the Colegio de San Gregorio, due to his brilliant participation in the discussions of the Academy of Jurisprudence, Romero Rubio received various offers to occupy positions in the government; however, he did not accept these invitations, preferring to finish his studies.

The Colegio de San Gregorio –considered as a center of independent thought–, underwent government scrutiny and was closed briefly under the return of Santa Anna on October 20, 1853. For this reason, Manuel Romero Rubio and Ignacio Mariscal, among other students, became the main organizers of the Club Político el Águila, which emerged as a protest, and which was joined by several figures who later occupied high positions in Mexican politics.

On January 11, 1854, Romero Rubio obtained his law degree from the Colegio de San Gregorio, and enrolled before the National Association Bar with the financial support of José Urbano Fonseca Martínez.

That same year, he opened his own law firm, which was one of the most prominent in the capital, and attended by figures from various political positions.

== Participation in the Plan of Ayutla ==
In 1854, being 26 years old, Manuel Romero Rubio joined the Plan of Ayutla, aimed at removing conservative, centralist President Santa Anna government and, with Miguel Buenrostro, he held a first meeting with Benito Juárez as the representative of the Liberal clubs in Mexico City.

After the triumph of the Plan of Ayutla, Romero Rubio was appointed magistrate of the first instance in the court of Tulancingo, Hidalgo. Two months later, he declined the position and returned to the capital to serve as secretary of the Supreme Court of Justice of the Nation and, later, as advisor to Colonel Agustín Alcerreca, governor of the Federal District.

== Romero Rubio Constituent and the Reform War ==
After Santa Anna's resignation in 1855 by the Ayutla Revolution, the Constituent Congress of 1856-1857 was established, where Manuel Romero Rubio – without having proposed a candidacy – was elected alternate deputy by the State of Mexico thanks to his excellent reputation as a magistrate in the Tulancingo court.

As member of the Constituent Congress, his votes in favor of the confiscation of the assets of the clergy, and the dissolution of the Society of Jesus –which had been reestablished in Mexico during the dictatorship of Santa Anna– are specially relevant.

His interventions in the Constituent Congress positioned Romero Rubio as a liberal politician and, in September 1857, he held the position of Secretary of the Interior of the Federal District during the government of Ignacio Comonfort. However, in December 1857 he resigned his position due to the addition of Juan José Baz –Governor of the Federal District– to the Plan of Tacubaya; whose main objective was to reject the Constitution of 1857.

At the end of March 1858, the new conservative government of Félix María Zuloaga apprehended Romero Rubio, Riva Palacio and other liberals who were transferred to the dungeons of the ex-Acordada, from where they corresponded with their allies, to stay informed about the events of the Reform War.

On November 20, 1858, when he was released along with the rest of the ex-Accorda political prisoners, Manuel Romero Rubio was appointed head of the Huastecas forces of the liberal army, and joined the front of General Juan J. de la Garza in Tamaulipas, who named him second in command of his division.

However, Romero Rubio remained at the head of the division when De la Garza was wounded after a confrontation with conservative forces in Corcovada; moment when Manuel Romero Rubio directed his troops to San Luis Potosí, where he met with other liberal leaders and was commissioned to meet with Benito Juárez in Veracruz, with the purpose of convincing him about the great need to speed up the declaration of the Reform laws, whose project had been postponed due to the country's political instability.

Finally, in July 1859, Juárez announced the Reform laws, and Romero Rubio returned to Tamaulipas, from where he organized his division to confront conservative groups that opposed the new Constitution.

== Participation in the government of Benito Juárez ==
Romero Rubio was involved in the Battle of Calpulapan, the last military confrontation of the Reform War.

With the victory of the liberal army in the Reform War, Benito Juárez established his government in Mexico City, and Romero Rubio was appointed to reorganize custom clearance and the government of the Federal District; later he served as president of the Congress and representative deputy of the State of Mexico.

== The French intervention and his support for Juárez ==
During the French intervention in 1863, Juárez left Mexico City leaving General de la Garza in charge of the organization of the military affairs of the capital, and Romero Rubio of the civil affairs. In July of that year, Manuel Romero Rubio was briefly imprisoned in the capital and later fled to Tula, Tamaulipas.

The political instability generated by the French intervention caused fractures in the liberal groups, and Romero Rubio joined Jesús González Ortega, who questioned the excessive extension of Juárez's mandate; however, these disagreements did not prevent Manuel Romero Rubio from supporting Juárez during the war against Maximilian I, gathering in 1867 a significant amount of economic resources to finance his army.

== The restored Republic: collaboration with the Juárez government ==
At the conclusion of the Reform War and despite its victory, the liberal party was divided. Juárez's intentions to extend his mandate further distanced the liberal groups and three main factions emerged: the Juaristas who supported the presidency of Benito Juárez, the Porfiristas who were on the side of Porfirio Díaz, and the Lerdistas who opted for leadership by Sebastián Lerdo de Tejada. In this context, the figure of Manuel Romero Rubio stood out for his ability to negotiate, and became a reference of intellectual and political unit. Despite belonging to the Lerdistas group, with the Juaristas victory in the elections of 1867, Romero Rubio was named President of the Chamber of Deputies in 1870, and his house was consolidated as one of the most important political meeting places of the time.

During the Juárez government, Romero Rubio was also named Supernumerary Magistrate of the Supreme Court, and deputy for the state of Chihuahua.

== Collaboration with the government of Lerdo de Tejada ==
In 1872, when Benito Juárez died, Lerdo de Tejada assumed the presidency initially on a temporary basis and, later, as elected president for the 1872–1876 term. In 1876, Lerdo was declared again elected president by the Legislative Branch and Manuel Romero Rubio was appointed Minister of State and Foreign Relations. However, the reelection of Lerdo de Tejada and the accusations of electoral fraud produced many disagreements that led to the armed uprising of the Porfirista group.

On November 21, 1876, with the military victory of Porfirio Díaz, Lerdo de Tejada and his cabinet –including Manuel Romero Rubio and Mariano Escobedo– went into exile in the U.S.

== Political estrangement between Romero Rubio and Lerdo de Tejada ==
The political rupture between Manuel Romero Rubio and Lerdo de Tejada began to forge before the Lerdismo fall in Mexico, due to the fact that although Romero Rubio had a career and was the main advisor of Lerdo de Tejada, the latter did not grant him an active position in his cabinet until the end, when he was appointed Secretary of Foreign Relations in 1876; that is to say, the same year that the armed uprising broke out to avoid the reelection of Lerdo de Tejada.

The popularity of Lerdo de Tejada waned not only before figures like Romero Rubio, but before other political agents who criticized him harshly for not listening neither respecting the ideas of others.

Some of the criticisms that Romero Rubio expressed about Lerdo before belonging to the Porfirian government was his obstinacy in only including Juarista's politicians in high positions in the public administration, which in his opinion produced the political fissure that allowed the Porfiristas to gain power in the political sphere.

In 1877, Romero Rubio returned to Mexico with the intention of negotiating a "peaceful campaign in favor of constitutional restoration", and landed in Veracruz on June 14, 1878; that is, two months after the U.S. government recognized the Díaz government as legitimate. Upon arriving to Mexico, he publicly declared his estrangement from Lerdo de Tejada.

== Romero Rubio and the consolidation of the Porfiriato ==
Upon the arrival in Mexico of Manuel Romero Rubio in 1878, the government of Porfirio Díaz had not yet consolidated its national political dominance. To achieve this, Díaz would need not only the support of his former comrades in arms, but stronger leadership that would ensure his future reelection, and that would integrate the different liberal factions that were in dispute.

Manuel Romero Rubio's presence in the country served to unify the different voices of the liberal party, and create a peace agreement that would give stability to the new government, which included not only Romero Rubio among its ranks, but also many other former Lerdist personalities.

Romero Rubio was recognized for his extraordinary ability to negotiate, so his adherence to the Porfirian project offered the possibility of legitimizing the government of Díaz by nullifying one of the main axes of dissent and allowing him a strategic alliance that gave him the backing of an experienced circle of Mexican politicians and intellectuals.

This pact between Díaz and the remnants of the Lerdismo was reflected in 1881 with the marriage between Carmen Romero Rubio Castelló –daughter of Manuel Romero Rubio– and Porfirio Díaz.

== Secretariat of the Interior: functions and contributions ==
After the 1884 elections, Romero Rubio was appointed Secretary General of the Interior by General Díaz; position that he held until his death.

The competences of the Secretary of the Interior under the leadership of Manuel Romero Rubio covered a wide range of powers that, due to their enormous social and political weight, were essential for the constitution of the Porfirian hegemony.

The core of the functions of the Secretary was to guarantee public tranquility, which implied its participation in various essential issues for the functioning of the state:

Monitor compliance with the Constitution. To achieve this, so the Secretary of the Interior maintained powers to request to the Congress of the Union the partial or total suspension of constitutional guarantees in cases of hazard of public peace, as well as the power to promote before the Chamber of deputies law initiatives and constitutional reforms, which allowed in 1887 the reelection of Díaz.

Intermediation in the relations between the capital with the Congress of the Union and the States of Mexico – untouched powers throughout the period in which Romero Rubio was in charge of the Secretary of the Interior.

Monitoring the legitimacy of the electoral elections, an essential issue to maintain the Díaz regime. As part of this function, the Secretariat of the Interior was also in charge of the postal service in the management of Romero Rubio, since the establishment of the electoral consensus required good communications between the capital and the States of Mexico. As can be seen, it's intermediation between the capital and the federal entities gave this Secretariat an essential role during the Porfiriato regime, which could not have continued without this political consensus.

Monitoring of freedom of the press; In this case, the Secretariat also monitored the movements of the press in Mexico, not always in favor of freedom of expression.

Coercive instruments. The Secretariat of the Interior had coercive instruments to maintain public tranquility. One of them was the National Guard of the Federal District and the Territory of Baja California; the Rural Police of the Federation – originally created to protect the main commercial routes that led to Mexico City.

The administration and surveillance of hospitals, public charities, pawnshops, piety mountains, lotteries, prisons, jails, penitentiaries, etc., the care of public health and the prevention of epidemics –of utmost importance in the 19th century– , the administration of "theaters and public entertainment", among others.

As for financial matters, one of the initiatives of Manuel Romero Rubio was the reduction of public spending by this Secretariat, which, despite its immense relevance, received a lower budget than ministries like the Secretariat of Finance and Public Credit.

The success of Manuel Romero Rubio's policies was recognized by his contemporaries, and helped him position himself as a fundamental element within the heterogeneous Porfirian cabinet, thanks to his immense capacity for negotiation and conciliation, becoming for this reason the right hand of Porfirio Díaz.

== Romero Rubio, the Liberal Union and the Scientists ==
As Minister of the Interior, Manuel Romero Rubio founded the Liberal Union group in 1892 with the aim of consolidating it as a political party, although it never fully became one. The Liberal Union was part of a broader plan that sought to give Diaz's reelection apparently liberal and democratic foundations. With a manifesto written by Justo Sierra, multiple calls for parades and demonstrations in favor of Díaz, and the creation of Porfirista clubs throughout the country, the Liberal Union managed to successfully attract all kinds of social and political strata that adhered to its cause. With this impressive maneuver, Romero Rubio managed to transform the political environment –which did not originally favor Díaz–, and consolidate him before public opinion as the only figure capable of continuing the progressive project and maintaining the country's stability.

The group that headed the Liberal Union formed the basis of what would later become known as the Científicos, a select intellectual and political circle close to the power. Manuel Romero Rubio was the leader and protector of the Científicos until his death, when he inherited his legacy to his political protégé, the young Secretary of the Treasury, José Yves Limantour.

Romero Rubio's death occurred on October 3, 1895, in Mexico City and was an event of national importance that shook the country's political class. All public buildings, including la Villa de Guadalupe, dressed in mourning, while schools, social clubs, and businesses closed their doors.

== National and international recognitions ==
- Second Councilor of the Mexican Bar Association (1878)
- Receives the Bust of the Liberator granted by the Government of Venezuela (1888)
- Along with Ignacio Mariscal, he presides over the celebrations of the First Pan-American Conference, held in Mexico City (1889)
- Decorated with the Order of Isabella the Catholic (1889)
- Appointed Commander of the Legion of Honor (1889)
- Assumes the presidency of the Bar Association (Mexico, 1892)
- Receives Order of the Crown of Italy (1893)
- Appointed Benemérito of the State of Colima (Colima Congress, November 12, 1895).
- In 1999 the Romero Rubio station of the CDMX metro on line B was inaugurated, due to its proximity to the Romero Rubio neighborhood of the Venustiano Carranza borough.
