= Juárez Hoy =

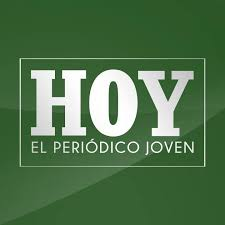
- Type: Daily newspaper
- Format: Broadsheet
- Owner(s): Televisión de la Frontera
- Founder(s): Rafael Fismaurece Meneses
- Publisher: Publicaciones Graficas Rafime S. C.
- Founded: 2008
- Language: Spanish
- Headquarters: Ciudad Juárez, Chihuahua, Mexico
- Website: http://juarezhoy.com.mx/

Juárez Hoy is a daily newspaper in Ciudad Juárez, Chihuahua, Mexico. Owned by Televisión de la Frontera in conjunction with Publicaciones Graficas Rafime, the newspaper began publication in 2008.

== See also ==
- List of newspapers in Mexico
