= La Extra =

Newspaper in Mexico

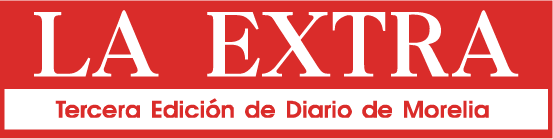
- Type: Daily newspaper
- Format: Tabloid
- Publisher: Grupo Diario de Morelia
- Editor: Miguel Sánchez Vargas
- Founded: 1965
- Language: Spanish
- Headquarters: Morelia, Mexico

La Extra is part of the Grupo Diario de Morelia, two newspapers in the city of Morelia, in the state of Michoacán in Mexico. Diario de Morelia is the morning newspaper and La Extra is the afternoon newspaper. It is printed in tabloid format and is based in Morelia.

== See also ==
- List of newspapers in Mexico
