= Diario Oficial =

Diario Oficial (or Diário Oficial), a common Spanish and Portuguese designation for a government gazette, may refer to:

- Diário Oficial da União, Brazil
- Diario Oficial de la República de Chile
- Diario Oficial (Colombia)
- Diario Oficial (El Salvador)
- Diario Oficial de la Federación, Mexico
- Diario Oficial (Uruguay)

== See also ==
- Official Journal (disambiguation)
