= Ricardo Flores Magón metro station =

Mexico City metro station

Ricardo Flores Magón
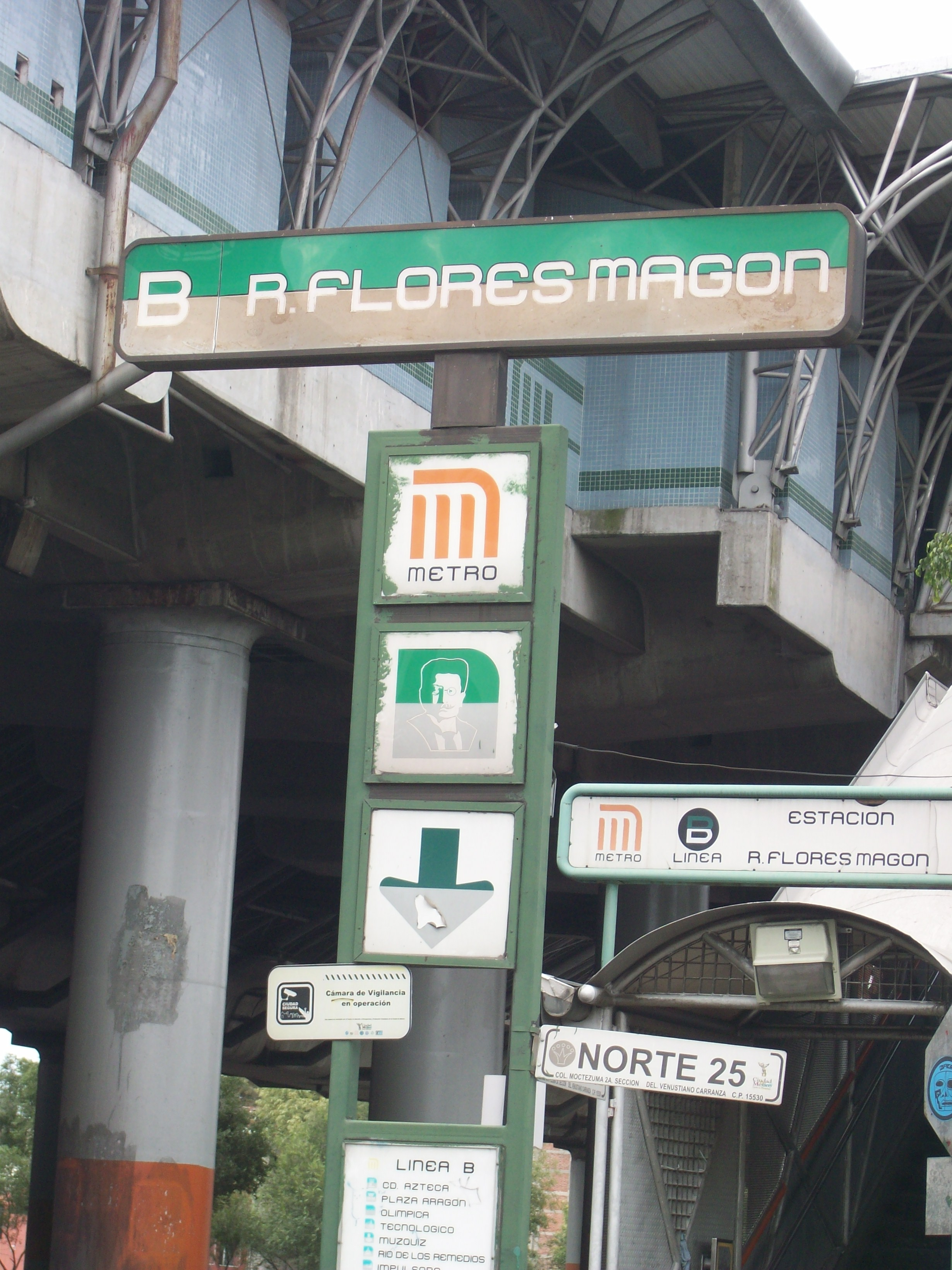

General information
- Location: Mexico City; Mexico
- Coordinates: 19°26′12″N 99°06′13″W
- System: Mexico City Metro
- Platforms: 2 side platforms
- Tracks: 2

Construction
- Structure type: Elevated

History
- Opened: 15 December 1999

Passengers
- 2025: 2,075,484 (Note: The data here is limited to the most recent ten years to avoid excessive listings; earlier figures can be found in this page's history or on the Mexico City Metro website. To calculate the average daily ridership, the annual total is divided by 365 days (366 in leap years), with decimals omitted from the result. Each station per line is ranked individually, as the system counts transfer stations separately. The percentage change is calculated automatically using the data from the current year and the previous year.) ▼11.81%
- Rank: 176/195

Services
| Preceding station | Mexico City Metro | Following station |
|---|---|---|
| Romero Rubio toward Ciudad Azteca | Line B | San Lázaro toward Buenavista |
Route map
Location
- Location within Mexico City
- Area map

Ricardo Flores Magón is an elevated station on Line B of the Mexico City Metro system.

The logo for the station shows a portrait of Ricardo Flores Magón. The station was opened on 15 December 1999.

== Ridership ==
Annual passenger ridership
| Year | Ridership | Average daily | Rank | % change | Ref. |
|---|---|---|---|---|---|
| 2025 | 2,075,484 | 5,686 | 176/195 | −11.81% |
| 2024 | 2,353,532 | 6,430 | 157/195 | −0.28% |
| 2023 | 2,360,064 | 6,465 | 148/195 | +29.37% |
| 2022 | 1,824,238 | 4,997 | 156/195 | +29.72% |
| 2021 | 1,406,335 | 3,852 | 158/195 | −3.98% |
| 2020 | 1,464,700 | 4,001 | 171/195 | −31.64% |
| 2019 | 2,142,619 | 5,870 | 182/195 | +4.73% |
| 2018 | 2,045,844 | 5,605 | 184/195 | +2.79% |
| 2017 | 1,990,396 | 5,453 | 185/195 | +1.70% |
| 2016 | 1,957,06 | 5,347 | 185/195 | −3.11% |

== See also ==
- Louise Michel station
- Kropotkinskaya
