= El Hijo del Ahuizote =

19th century Mexican newspaper

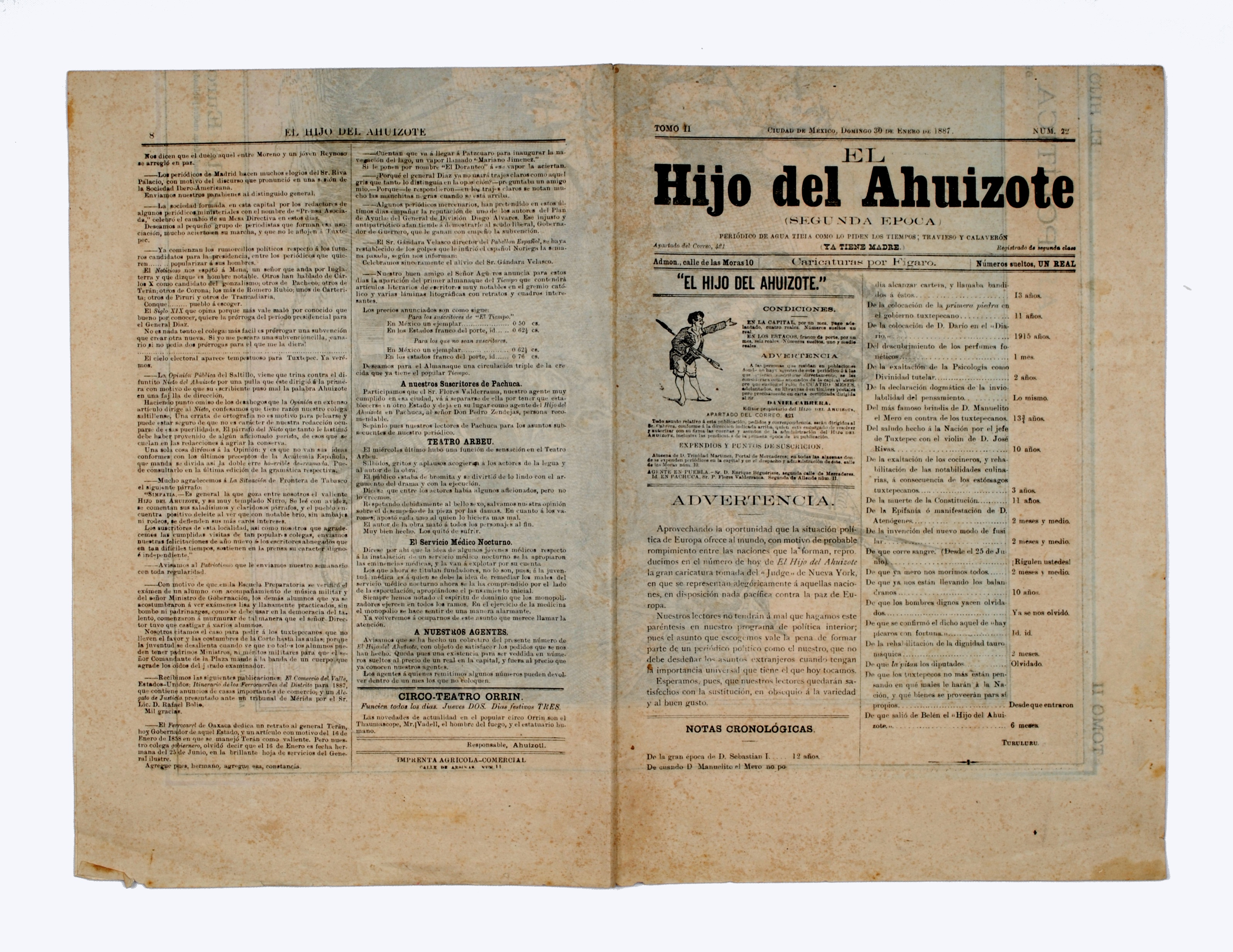
An 1887 edition of El Hijo del Ahuizote

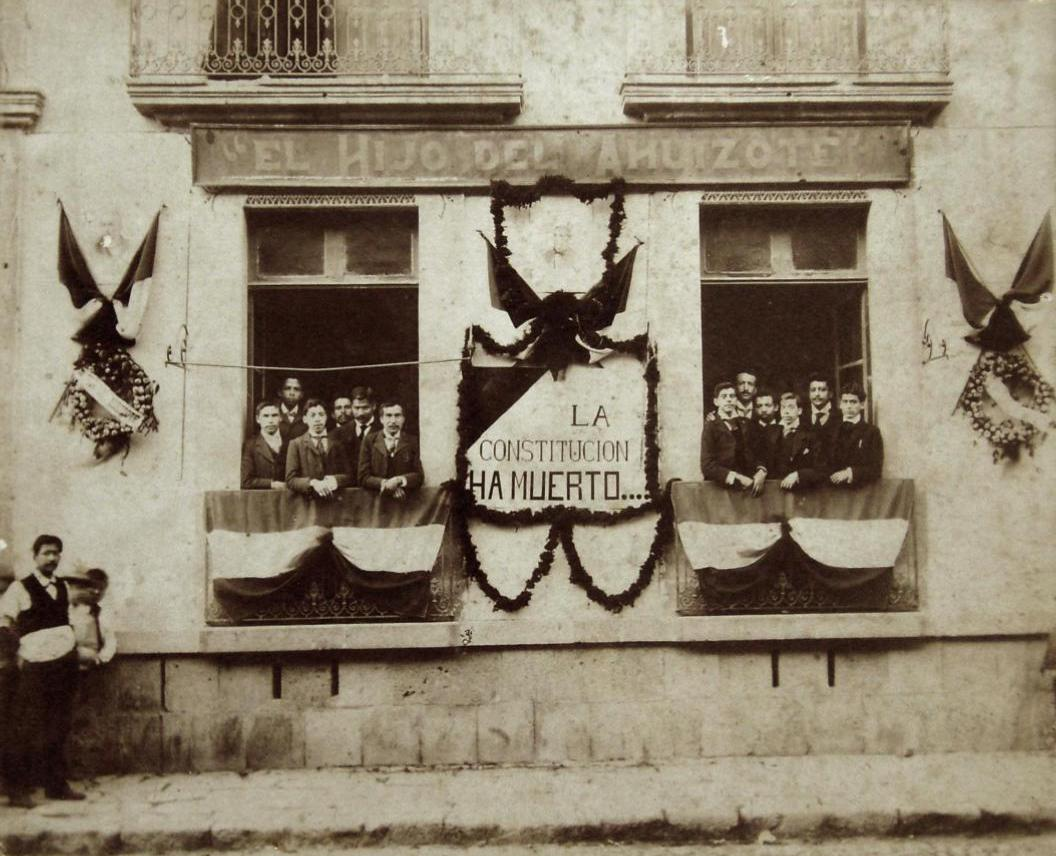
"The Constitution is Dead": 1903 protest banner at the Mexico City offices of El Hijo del Ahuizote

El Hijo del Ahuizote (English: The Son of the Ahuizotl) was a satirical Mexican weekly newspaper founded by Daniel Cabrera Rivera, Manuel Pérez Bibbins, and Juan Sarabia. It published its first edition on 23 August 1885. The name was chosen to evoke the earlier newspaper El Ahuizote, founded in 1874 in opposition to President Sebastián Lerdo de Tejada.

In July 1902, Ricardo and Enrique Flores Magón took over and expanded the publication. After their takeover, the content and caricatures were used to satirize and oppose President Porfirio Díaz. It closed in April 1903 when the police arrested its entire staff; the Flores Magón brothers continued their journalistic work on the newspaper Regeneración.

The newspaper is considered to be important to the Mexican Revolution.
