= Project diary =

Written record of a project

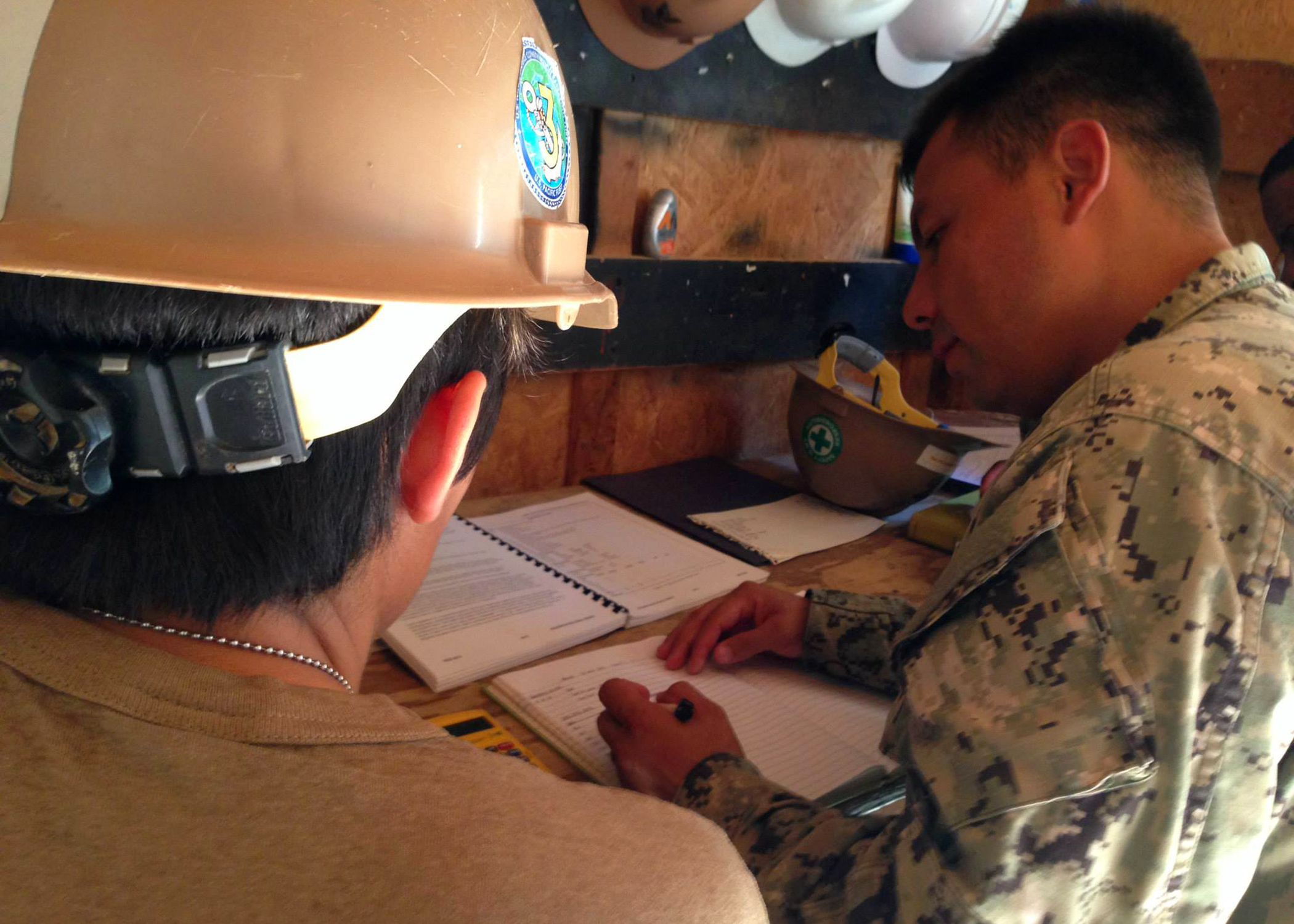
Project logs being inspected at a US Navy station

A project diary (also history, journal or log) is a record of a project which is compiled while it is being done.

This record might be used as legal evidence if there is a dispute about the outcome of the project such as a cost overrun. To facilitate this, entries should be indelible, time-stamped and signed so that they may not be easily altered in retrospect. The details kept would typically include a record of the time and content of communications such as orders and instructions; events, incidents and their remediation; and the names of the people and parties responsible.
