= Eduardo Martínez Celis =

Mexican journalist, author and politician

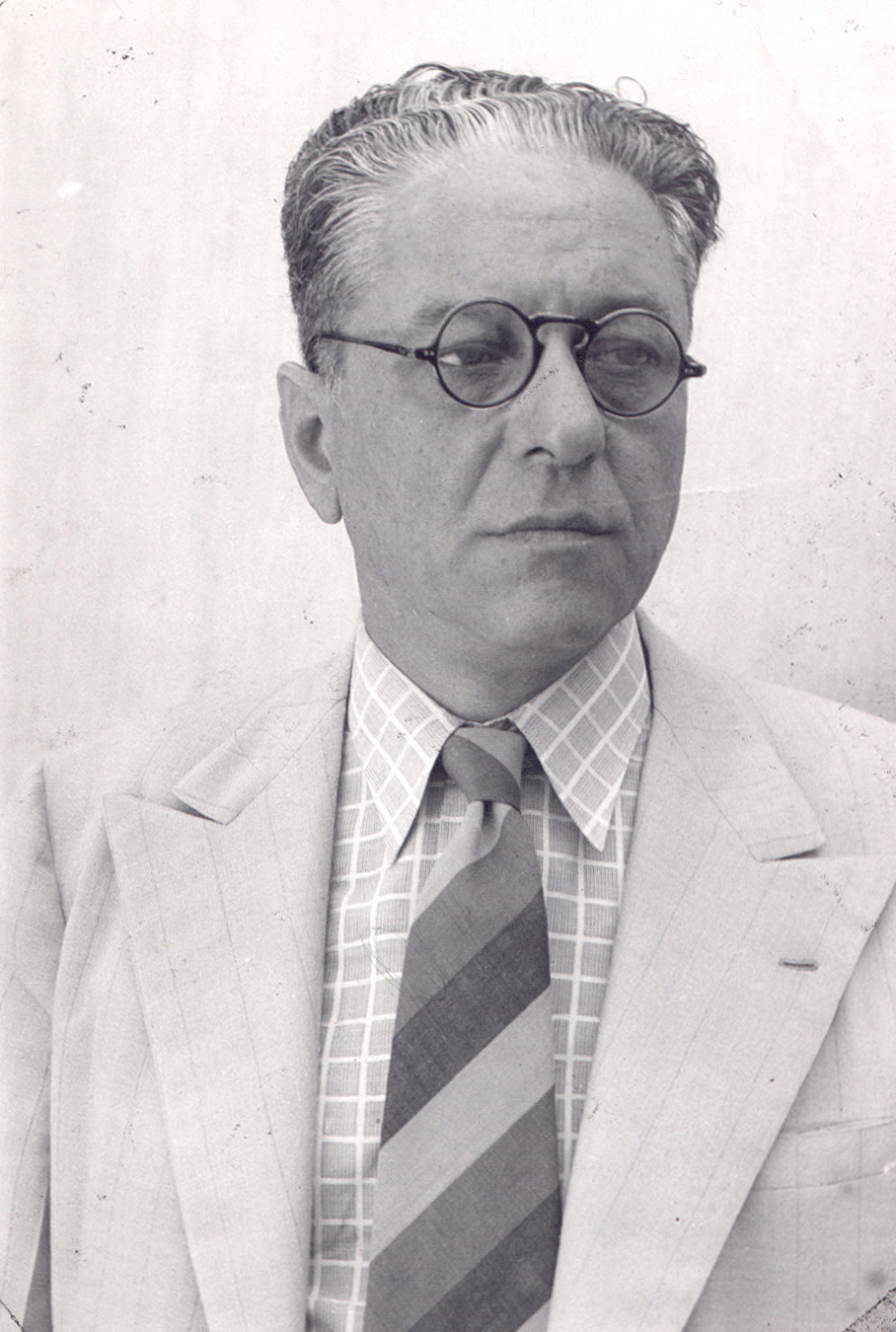
- Born: 29 October 1890; Zamora de Hidalgo, Mexico
- Died: 5 November 1943 (aged 53); Monterrey, Mexico
- Occupation: Journalist
- Spouse: Josefina López García
- Children: 6

Eduardo Martínez Celis (29 October 1890, Zamora, Michoacán – 5 November 1943, Monterrey, Nuevo León) was a Mexican journalist, author and politician. Pseudonym: Abbé Sieyès

== Early life ==
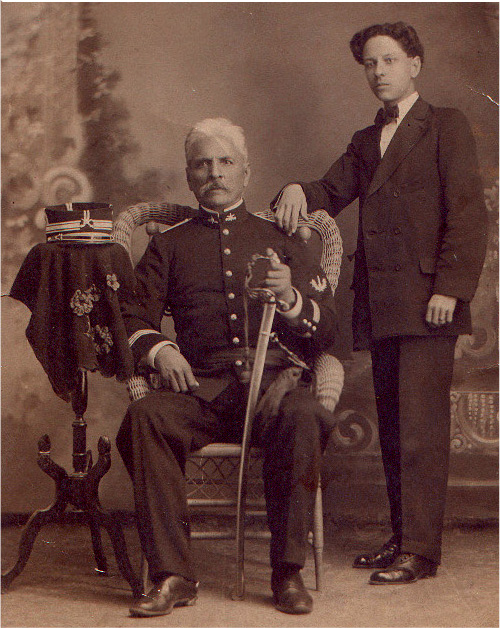
Eduardo Martínez Celis with his father, Lt. Col. Domingo Martínez Barrón. Matamoros, Tamaulipas - January 26, 1909.

His parents were Josefa Celis Arceo, a native of Jiquilpan, Michoacán, and Lt. Col. Domingo Martínez Barrón, a native of Santiago de Querétaro—a veteran of the War of Reform, French Intervention and Second Mexican Empire.

Due to his father’s military duties, the Martínez-Celis family moved from Zamora, Michoacán to Morelia, Michoacán and, later on, to Guadalajara, Jalisco, where Eduardo began his studies. In 1901 the family took up residence in Monterrey, Nuevo León, where he completed his higher education at the Colegio Civil. Years later, when this school became the Escuela de Bachilleres, he became a professor of Literature and History of Literature at said institution.

== Professional life ==
Rafael "Rip Rip" Martínez began him on his journalistic career. In 1909, Martínez Celis was a reporter for the newspaper El Renacimiento; he continued with directive positions in El Noticiero (1911), El Combate (1912) and Nueva Patria—all in Monterrey.

Following this period, he lived in Mexico City from 1914 to 1916, where he collaborated in El Heraldo, El Demócrata and El Pueblo, the latter owned by Heriberto Frías. Upon returning to Monterrey, he joined El Progreso as editor-in-chief from 1917 to 1918.

On January 31, 1919 he co-founded El Porvenir alongside Jesús Cantú Leal, Ricardo Arenales and Federico Gómez, occupying the newly-founded newspaper's chief editorial position during the next 17 years. Afterwards, he would assume the direction of El Tiempo, when this newspaper was founded in August 1936.

== Literature ==
In 1933 he completed a book of verses that he titled Rima íntima, of which only a few copies were printed for his wife, Josefina López García, and their six offspring.

He also authored two historical essays: El Cuarto Poder a través de los siglos. - Reseña histórica del periodismo en Nuevo León desde 1824 hasta 1936, published in a special edition of El Tiempo on August 5, 1937, with copies on the front pages of the principal newspapers, weeklies and magazines of Mexico; and El teatro en Monterrey a través de 75 años, published in El Porvenir on January 31, 1941.

Martínez Celis was also a playwright; the works that he co-authored with David Alberto Cossío include La rebelde, Deuda de gloria, El abismo, El diablo romántico, Mujeres de acción and Los amigos del señor gobernador.

As a literary point of interest, Eduardo's younger brother, Colonel Guillermo Martínez Celis—who was in charge, alongside lieutenant colonel Ismael Flores del Valle, of the Deposit for Generals, Chiefs and Officials of the ex Federal Army, created in 1919 by general Pablo González Garza with the objective of recruiting the top brass of the extinct Federal Army, during the Mexican Revolution— plays a part in the autobiographical novel The Rebel, based on the memoirs of Leonor Villegas de Magnón. Guillermo resumes his role in The Rebels, Mónica Lavín's 2011 novel recounting Villegas de Magnón's story.

== Political activities ==
Martínez Celis took an active interest in politics, presiding as vice-president of the Partido Constitucional Progresista (Progressive Constitutionalist Party) of Nuevo León, which nominated Francisco I. Madero and José María Pino Suárez as its candidates for president and vice-president of Mexico in October 1911. Martínez Celis was also director of El Combate, the semi-official newspaper of the Partido Constitucional Progresista.

From 1920 to 1922, he occupied the office of congressman in the Nuevo León Legislature representing the Partido Constitucional Independiente (Independent Constitutionalist Party); however, his political activities were overshadowed by his prominent journalistic career.

Martínez Celis died due to cardiac arrest on November 5, 1943 in Monterrey.

== Selected works by Eduardo Martínez Celis ==
Poetry:

- Rima íntima - (1933)

Essays:

- Un tópico cualquiera
- El Cuarto Poder a través de los siglos. - Reseña histórica del periodismo en Nuevo León desde 1824 hasta 1936 - (1937)
- El teatro en Monterrey a través de 75 años - (1941)

Theater:

- La rebelde - (1913)
- Deuda de gloria - (1915)
- El abismo - (1916)
- El diablo romántico - (1932)
- Mujeres de acción - (1933)
- Los amigos del señor gobernador - (1934)
