= El Diario de Lima =

Spanish newspaper

- Type: Daily newspaper
- Founded: 1790
- Language: Spanish

El Diario de Lima was a Spanish newspaper published from Lima, Peru. It is oldest daily newspaper published in Latin America. It was founded in 1790.
