= Diario Extra =

Diario Extra may refer to

- Diario Extra (Costa Rica), a tabloid magazine in Costa Rica
- Diario Extra (Ecuador), a newspaper in Ecuador
