= Alkartu (Mexico) =

Alkartu was a publication issued from Mexico City in 1942–1947. The periodical was published by the Communist Party of Euskadi. It was published in Spanish language. Luis Zapirain was the director of Alkartu. Secundino Ortega was the editor of Alkartu. The office of Alkartu was located at Morelos, 77-3. The party also published an edition of Alkartu in Toulouse, France.
