= Diario de Morelia =

Newspaper in Morelia, Michoacán, Mexico

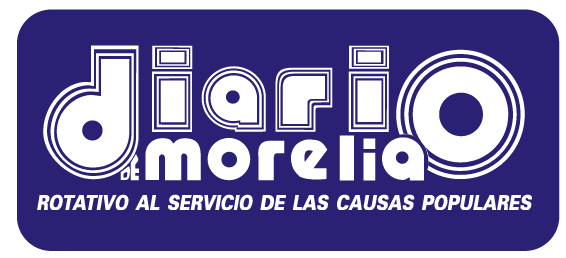
- Type: Daily newspaper
- Format: Tabloid
- Publisher: Grupo Diario de Morelia
- Editor: Miguel Sánchez Vargas
- Founded: 1939
- Language: Spanish
- Headquarters: Morelia, Mexico
- Circulation: Regional
- Website: Diario de Morelia

Diario de Morelia is part of the Grupo Diario de Morelia, two newspapers in the city of Morelia, in the state of Michoacán in Mexico. Diario de Morelia, morning newspaper with more than 65 years publishing and La Extra, Afternoon newspaper with more than 45 years. Is printed in tabloid format and is based in Morelia.

The Virtual Center Cervantes recognizes La Extra with one of the newspapers with digital edition.
