= Diario Oficial (Uruguay) =

Government gazette of Uruguay

The Diario Oficial is the official gazette of the Government of Uruguay that contains the laws, decrees, acts, and most pertinent documents and public notices of the President, Parliament, and government agencies of Uruguay.

First published in 1905, the Diario Oficial is printed by the National Printing Office (Spanish: Impresiones y Publicaciones Oficiales, IMPO).

In 1999, the Diario Oficial debuted its digital version. In 2015, the full digital archive was published with free access. The publication is no longer printed since 2016.
