= El Diario de Nuevo Laredo =

El Diario de Nuevo Laredo
- Type: Daily newspaper
- Format: Berliner
- Owner: Ruperto Villareal Montemayor
- Editor: Marco Guillermo Villarreal Marroquín
- Founded: 1948
- Headquarters: Nuevo Laredo, Mexico
- Website: www.diariolaredo.com

El Diario de Nuevo Laredo (The Nuevo Laredo Daily) is a Spanish language newspaper published in Nuevo Laredo, Tamaulipas, Mexico. The newspaper was founded in 1948 by Ruperto Villareal Montemayor. It is Nuevo Laredo's oldest Daily newspaper (the oldest nonstop publisher). According to El Diario, the newspaper is the most circulated in Nuevo Laredo.

In 2008, El Diario change its format to a free 24-page Berliner. This broader audience gave Nuevo Laredo Companies the result they expected.
