= L'Echo français =

French biweekly newspaper

L'Echo français ('French Echo') was a French biweekly newspaper published from Mexico City. It was founded on January 26, 1902. The newspaper was published between 1902 and 1925. Anatole (alias Henri) Papillaud was the founder of the newspaper, albeit Papillaud left Mexico a few months after the launch of the publication. It was one of two main French-language publications in Mexico at the time. Its offices were located at Calle Uruguay 95.

Ownership of the newspaper was later taken over by Max Athénosy. In 1925 the newspaper merged with Courrier du Mexique.
