= Organización Editorial Mexicana =

Mexican print media and broadcasting company

- Industry: Newspapers
- Founded: 1941; 85 years ago
- Founder: Mario Vázquez Raña
- Headquarters: Guillermo Prieto 7 Colonia San Rafael, Cuauhtémoc, Mexico City, Mexico
- Key people: Paquita Ramos Vázquez (president)
- Website: oem.com.mx

Organización Editorial Mexicana, also known as OEM, is the largest Mexican print media company and the largest newspaper company in Latin America. The company owns a large newswire service, it includes 70 Mexican daily newspapers, 24 radio stations and 44 websites.

Organización Editorial Mexicana was founded by Jose Garcia Valseca The daily circulation of the print edition of La Prensa, one of OEM's newspapers, is more than 450,000 readers. It is considered the most widely read newspaper in Mexico City. According to Alexa.com, the online version of the media company is one of the most visited webpages in Mexico.

Organización Editorial Mexicana owns El Sol de México, ESTO and La Prensa. Circulation combined tops every news print media in the Mexican capital.

== Mexican newspapers owned by OEM ==
Mexico city and metro area

- El Sol de México
- La Prensa
- ESTO
- El Sol de México/Mediodía
- Diario Deportivo Marcador
- Trato Directo

Central region

- El Occidental - Guadalajara, Jalisco
- El Sol de Guadalajara - Guadalajara, Jalisco
- ESTO Jalisco - Guadalajara, Jalisco
- La Prensa Jalisco - Guadalajara, Jalisco
- El Sol de San Luis - San Luis Potosí, San Luis Potosí
- La Prensa del Centro - San Luis Potosí, San Luis Potosí
- ESTO del Centro - San Luis Potosí, San Luis Potosí
- El Sol de Toluca - Toluca, Estado de México
- EXTRA de El Sol - Toluca, Estado de México
- El Sol del Centro - Aguascalientes, Aguascalientes
- El Sol de Morelia - Morelia, Michoacán
- El Sol de Zamora - Zamora, Michoacán
- Diario de Querétaro - Querétaro, Querétaro
- El Sol de Irapuato - Irapuato, Guanajuato
- El Sol de Salamanca - Salamanca, Guanajuato
- El Sol de San Juan del Río - San Juan del Río, Querétaro
- El Sol del Bajío - Celaya, Guanajuato
- Noticias Vespertinas - León, Guanajuato

Gulf of Mexico region

- Diario de Xalapa - Xalapa, Veracruz
- ESTO de Veracruz - Xalapa, Veracruz
- El Sol de Córdoba - Córdoba, Veracruz
- El Sol de Orizaba - Orizaba, Veracruz
- El Sol de Tampico - Tampico, Tamaulipas
- El Sol de la Tarde - Tampico, Tamaulipas

North region

- El Heraldo de Chihuahua - Chihuahua, Chihuahua
- El Heraldo de la Tarde - Chihuahua, Chihuahua
- El Mexicano - Ciudad Juárez, Chihuahua
- El Sol de Durango - Durango, Durango
- Diario de Durango - Durango, Durango
- El Sol de Parral - Hidalgo del Parral, Chihuahua
- El Sol de Zacatecas - Zacatecas, Zacatecas
- Noticias de El Sol de la Laguna - Torreón, Coahuila
- ESTO del Norte - Torreón, Coahuila

East region

- El Sol de Cuautla - Cuautla, Morelos
- El Sol de Cuernavaca - Cuernavaca, Morelos
- El Sol de Hidalgo - Pachuca, Hidalgo
- El Sol de Puebla - Puebla, Puebla
- La Voz de Puebla - Puebla, Puebla
- ESTO de Puebla - Puebla, Puebla
- El Sol de Tehuacán - Tehuacán, Puebla
- El Sol de Tlaxcala - Tlaxcala, Tlaxcala
- El Sol de Tulancingo - Tulancingo, Hidalgo

Pacific coast and northwest region

- Cambio Sonora - Hermosillo, Sonora
- El Sol de Acapulco - Acapulco, Guerrero
- El Sol de Mazatlán - Mazatlán, Sinaloa
- El Sol de Sinaloa - Culiacán, Sinaloa
- El Sol de Culiacán - Culiacán, Sinaloa
- La Prensa de Sinaloa - Mazatlán, Sinaloa
- ESTO de Sinaloa - Mazatlán, Sinaloa
- El Sol de Tijuana - Tijuana, Baja California
- ESTO de las Californias - Tijuana, Baja California
- La Voz de la Frontera - Mexicali, Baja California
- El Centinela - Mexicali, Baja California
- El Sudcaliforniano - La Paz, Baja California Sur

Southeast region

- Diario del Sur - Tapachula, Chiapas
- El Heraldo de Chiapas - Tuxtla Gutierrez, Chiapas
- ESTO de Chiapas - Tuxtla Gutierrez, Chiapas
- El Heraldo de Tabasco - Villahermosa, Tabasco

== Companies owned by OEM ==
- Cartones Ponderosa
- Graficas La Prensa
- Comercial Fletera Mexico
- Espectaculares Televisivos de Alta Definicion
- Ecofibras Ponderosa
- Productora Nacional de Papel
- Compañía Transportadora Nacional
- Estudios Tepeyac
- Informex

== See also ==
- Grupo Reforma
- List of newspapers in Mexico
