= Diario de Yucatán =

Regional Mexican daily newspaper

- Language: Spanish
- Headquarters: Mérida, Yucatán, Mexico
- Website: www.yucatan.com.mx

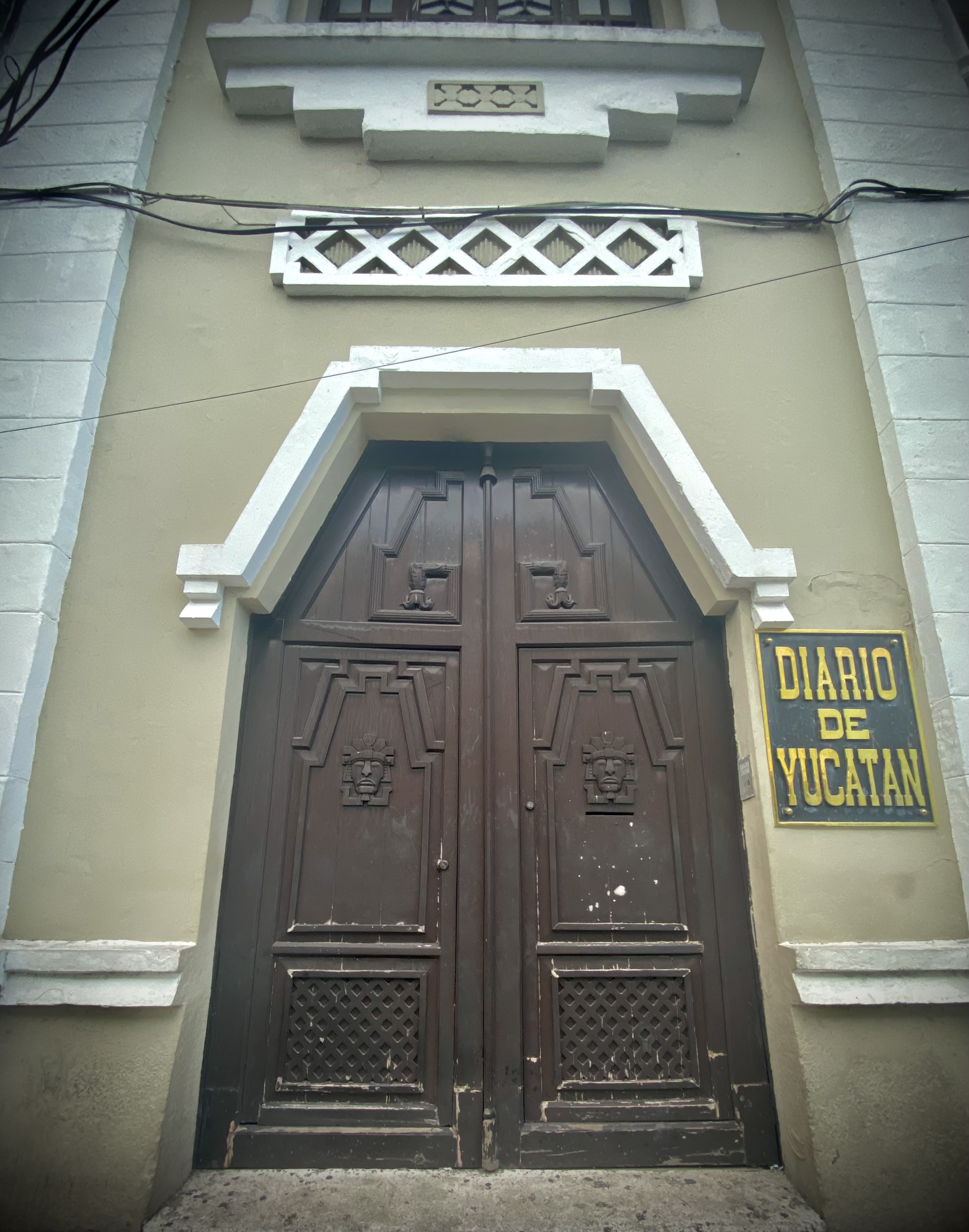
Diario de Yucatán

Diario de Yucatán is a major, regional Mexican daily newspaper headquartered in Mérida, Yucatán. The newspaper covers the three Mexican states of the Yucatán Peninsula - Yucatán, Campeche, and Quintana Roo. Diario de Yucatán, which was launched on May 31, 1925 by Carlos R. Menéndez, has a daily circulation of approximately 70,000 copies.

== See also ==
- List of newspapers in Mexico
