= El Informador (Mexico) =

Mexican daily newspaper

- First issue of El Informador, published on October 5, 1917
- Type: Daily newspaper
- Format: Broadsheet
- Owner(s): Unión Editorialista, S.A. de C.V.
- Founded: 1917
- Language: Spanish
- Headquarters: Guadalajara, Jalisco, Mexico
- Website: www.informador.mx

El Informador is an independent, daily newspaper published and headquartered in Guadalajara, Jalisco, Mexico. El Informador was founded by Jesús Álvarez del Castillo on October 5, 1917. The average daily circulation of the publishing group to which this newspaper belongs is 45,000 copies, of which 25,000 are subscriptions. This makes it the newspaper with the largest circulation in the state of Jalisco and the sixth largest in the country.

== See also ==
- List of newspapers in Mexico
