= Morelos Commune =

Commune of Mexico (1913–1917)

The Morelos Commune (Spanish: Comuna de Morelos) was the political and economic system established in the Mexican state of Morelos between 1913 and 1917. Led by Emiliano Zapata, the people of Morelos implemented a series of wide-reaching social reforms based on the proposals laid out in the Plan of Ayala.

During the Mexican Revolution, the economy of Morelos was completely reorganised, seeing the nationalisation of its sugar industry and the widespread redistribution of land from haciendas to the peasantry. This process was overseen by local institutions of self-governance, under the defense of Zapata's Liberation Army of the South (ELS).

Established in rebellion against the government of Victoriano Huerta, the Commune was officially dissolved by the Constitution of Mexico in 1917 and Zapata himself was killed by the Constitutional Army in 1919. After Álvaro Obregón's rise to power, many of Zapata's proposals were implemented in Morelos by the new government of Mexico and the ELS was integrated into the Mexican Army.

The term "Morelos Commune" was coined by the Mexican historian Adolfo Gilly, in an invocation of the Paris Commune of 1871. Other historians have compared the period with the Soviets of the Russian Revolution and the Makhnovshchina of Eastern Ukraine. It has also been a point of inspiration for the Zapatista uprising of 1994, which took place in the Mexican state of Chiapas.

== Background ==
The native institutions of Morelos traced their ancestry back to the time of the Aztec Empire, before the Spanish conquest of the Americas; the local Nahua people held the land in the region under common ownership, which guaranteed them autonomy and self-sufficiency. During the 19th century, the sugar industry in Morelos grew increasingly profitable, as foreign demand for the product expanded and new technologies eased production and distribution. In order to grow the Mexican economy, the regime of Porfirio Díaz oversaw a mass concentration of land ownership into private property, reducing the amount of common land in the country to only 2% of arable land. The state of Morelos, where much of the country's sugar industry was concentrated, was among the hardest hit by this policy. Only 23.7% of land in Morelos managed to remain outside the private ownership of a hacienda.

Lands previously held under common ownership were taken over by haciendas, which extracted increasingly high profits from the sugar crop, with many of the state's peasants becoming landless. The people of Morelos attempted to resist the seizure of common land through judicial means, but the privatization of land only accelerated. Sugar production increased dramatically with the privatization of land, forcing peasants onto the large estates as agricultural labourers. Morelos' peasants were forced to work for the haciendas year-round and were only provided with earthen floor huts for accommodation, keeping them in poverty. Still the people of Morelos managed to maintain some of their traditional self-governance, holding enough property under common ownership as to provide an alternative to the industrial estates.

== History ==
=== Revolution ===
The Mexican Revolution broke out in 1910, as several different rebel groups under the leadership of Francisco Madero rose up against the established order of the Porfiriato. When the Porifirian sugar estates collapsed, leaving no alternative means of subsistence for their workers, Madero's promises of agrarian reform won over the peasant leader Emiliano Zapata, who organised the sugar workers of Morelos to attack the haciendas and seize the land for their communities. This series of expropriations of privately owned land by armed peasants led to the establishment of the Liberation Army of the South (ELS), which spearheaded the revolutionary uprising in Morelos. On 20 May 1911, the ELS captured Cuautla, and on 21 May, they captured the state capital of Cuernavaca.

By the time that Porfirio Díaz was ousted and Madero became President of Mexico, the revolutionary forces had completely taken over the state of Morelos. President Madero soon went back on his promises of agrarian reform and ordered the Zapatistas to disarm. On 25 November 1911, Zapata responded by issuing the Plan of Ayala, in which he called for the autonomy of Morelos and the immediate redistribution of land from the haciendas to the peasantry.

Madero attempted to use the Mexican Army to suppress the Zapatistas, but was soon ousted in a coup by the army's commander-in-chief Victoriano Huerta. Zapata rebelled against Huerta, whom he considered to be a reactionary, and formed an alliance with the Northern rebel Pancho Villa. Huerta subsequently ordered the intensification of the war against the peasantry of Morelos, killing thousands and causing many more to flee, but he was ultimately unable to eliminate the Zapatistas. Huerta was eventually ousted by a broad revolutionary coalition, consisting of radicals (led by Villa and Zapata) and constitutionalists (led by Venustiano Carranza). But when Zapata demanded that the constitutionalists incorporate his Plan of Ayala into their programme, Carranza refused, rejecting its egalitarian policies of land redistribution. In September 1914, Zapata and Villa united at the Convention of Aguascalientes, going on to drive the constitutionalists out of the capital.

=== La Comuna ===
By December 1914, a power vacuum had opened up in Mexico, which was left without any centralized government. At that time, Mexico City was occupied by Villa and the Zapatistas, the latter of whom desired to "burn the [presidential] chair to end ambitions".

On 9 December 1914, Zapata's Liberation Army of the South left the capital for their home state of Morelos, where they established a self-governing and egalitarian society, historiographically known as the "Morelos Commune".

Radical agrarian reforms were carried out by Manuel Palafox, who was appointed by Zapata as the state's Secretary of Agriculture. Municipal councils of local elders were convened in order to determine how to break up the haciendas and redistribute their land holdings, with decisions being passed from the bottom-up to the Zapatista command for enforcement. Workers' cooperatives were also established to manage agricultural output, while credit unions were set up in order to support the reorganisation of land ownership.

In October 1915, the Zapatistas passed a series of laws that brought industry under state ownership and redistributed land to the peasantry. These reforms were implemented in Morelos, but did not extend elsewhere in Mexico, due to the provincialism of the Zapatistas. The agrarian reforms and the nationalisation of the sugar industry in Morelos encouraged the state's agricultural and industrial workers to unite around the Zapatistas' Ayala Plan, which gave the movement a tendency towards anti-capitalism.

=== Dissolution ===
As Morelos itself was completely untouched by American corporate interests, Zapata distinguished himself as one of the only Latin American social revolutionaries that did not attack the United States. But the Zapatistas' threats against private property nevertheless alarmed the government of the United States, as over one-quarter of Mexican land was held by American corporations. They decided to intervene in the conflict on the side of the Constitutionalists, overseeing the ultimate defeat of the Conventionists.

Outside of Morelos, the Mexican bourgeoisie consolidated control over the government, culminating with the promulgation of the Constitution of Mexico in February 1917. As the constitution included no promise of agrarian reform, Zapata continued his rebellion against the constitutional government of Venustiano Carranza. In April 1919, Zapata was assassinated by government forces in Chinameca, and the Revolution in Morelos was brought to an end.

The Zapatistas thereafter shifted their allegiance to Álvaro Obregón, who gained their support by promising to implement their proposed agrarian reforms. Zapata's Liberation Army of the South was incorporated into the Constitutional Army and the war in Morelos was brought to an end, with the Zapatista land reform being reintroduced in the southern state.

== Legacy ==
In his 1971 book The Mexican Revolution, Mexican historian Adolfo Gilly called the proto-state established by Zapata the "Morelos Commune". He drew a direct comparison between it and the Paris Commune of 1871, due to their shared basis in direct democracy, egalitarianism and the social ownership of the means of production.

Belgian critical theorist Bruno Bosteels would later compare the Morelos Commune to the Soviets of the Russian Revolution, due to the decentralised and autonomous organisational structure used for collective decision-making in Morelos. Edward Kantowicz also compared the Commune to the Makhnovshchina in eastern Ukraine, due to similar structures and ideals.

In contemporary history, the legacy of the Morelos Commune has been claimed by the Zapatista uprising of 1994, during which the Zapatista Army of National Liberation (EZLN) established communal forms of governance in Chiapas.

== Bibliography ==
- Akers Chacón, Justin (2018). Radicals in the Barrio: Magonistas, Socialists, Wobblies, and Communists in the Mexican-American Working Class. Haymarket Books. ISBN 978-1-60846-776-1.
- Bosteels, Bruno (2014). "The Mexican Commune". In Brincat, Shannon (ed.). Communism in the 21st Century. Vol. 2. pp. 161–189. ISBN 978-1-4408-0125-9. LCCN 2013023266.
- Bosteels, Bruno (2017). "State or Commune: Viewing the October Revolution from the Land of Zapata". Constellations. 24 (4): 570–579. doi:10.1111/1467-8675.12332.
- Clover, Joshua (2020). "Riot, Strike, Commune: Gendering a Civil War". New Global Studies. 14 (2): 121–131. doi:10.1515/ngs-2020-0014.
- Gilly, Adolfo (2005) [1971]. "The Morelos Commune". The Mexican Revolution. Translated by Camiller, Patrick. The New Press. pp. 240–297. ISBN 1-56584-932-9.
- Hart, Paul (2012). "Beyond Borders: Causes and Consequences of the Mexican Revolution". In De Len̤, Arnoldo (ed.). War Along the Border: The Mexican Revolution and Tejano Communities. Texas A&M University Press. pp. 8–30. ISBN 978-1-60344-525-2. LCCN 2011018192.
- Kantowicz, Edward (1999). "Revolutions, Constitutions, and Institutions: The Mexican Revolution". The Rage of Nations. William B. Eerdmans Publishing Company. pp. 234–251. ISBN 0-8028-4455-3. LCCN 98-35887.
- Malthaner, Stefan; Malešević, Siniša (2022). "Violence, Legitimacy, and Control: The Dynamics of Rebel Rule". Participation and Conflict. 15 (1): 1–16. doi:10.1285/i20356609v15i1p01.
- Smolski, Andrew R.; Sethness Castro, Javier; Reid Ross, Alexander (October 2018). "Lessons from exits foreclosed: An exilic interpretation of the Mexican and Russian Revolutions, 1910–1924". Capital & Class. 42 (3): 453–488. doi:10.1177/0309816818759229. S2CID 158545083.
- Rainoff, Greg Daniel (2011). "Modernization". The Nature of Stories: Colonization and Disintegration in Mexican History (Master of Arts). San Diego State University. pp. 20–27.
- Roman, Richard (1984). ""The Interrupted Revolution": An Explication and Critique of Adolfo Gilly's Interpretation of the Mexican Revolution". Canadian Journal of Latin American and Caribbean Studies. 9 (18): 3–30. doi:10.1080/08263663.1984.10816539.
