= Felipe Neri =

Felipe Neri Jiménez
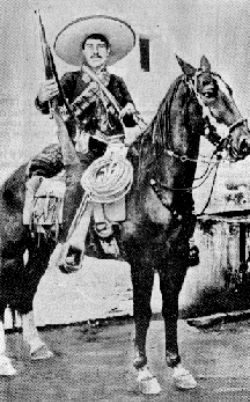
- Born: 23 August 1884; Cuernavaca, Morelos, Mexico
- Died: January 1914 (aged 29); Tepoztlan, Morelos, Mexico
- Military career
- Allegiance: Liberation Army of the South
- Service years: 1911–1914
- Rank: Divisional General
- Conflicts: Mexican Revolution

Felipe Neri (sometimes known as Felipe Neri Jiménez; 23 August 1884 – January 1914) was a soldier and general in the Mexican Revolution.

== Early life ==
He was born in the neighborhood of Gualupita, in Cuernavaca, Morelos, on 23 August 1884, to Pedro Neri and Faustina Jiménez. Before the Mexican Revolution Felipe Neri worked as a kiln operator at a Chinameca hacienda.

== The Revolution ==
He joined the rebellion in March 1911 and took part in the Battle of Cuautla. A bomb which he mis-threw exploded nearby and left him completely deaf. Subsequently he served with Zapata as an explosives expert and divisional general. He constructed bombs for the revolutionaries out of salmon cans. According to some sources the incident that took away his hearing made Neri particularly ruthless in how he treated captive prisoners; he either had them executed or he would cut off one of their ears as a "mark of Cain". He also applied the same punishment to deserters who left the Zapatista army in order to go back to work on the haciendas. His injury and this practice earned him the nickname of mochaorejas - "clipper of ears".

== On the Zapatista Revolutionary Junta ==
He became part of the Zapatista's ruling Revolutionary Junta, headed by Emiliano Zapata, in May 1913, together with Eufemio Zapata, Genovevo de la O, Amador Salazar, Otilio Montaño Sánchez, and Manuel Palafox (who acted as the secretary).

== Conflicts with other Zapatista chiefs ==
On several occasions Neri and his men would come into confrontation with other Zapatistas, notably with the troops of Genovevo de la O, and at one time almost with Zapata himself. In November 1913 Neri had appropriated some guns from the other Zapatista commanders which earned him a rebuke from Zapata. Neri answered with a bold letter in which he refused to return the guns, accused Zapata of favouritism and not giving him enough credit, and threatened that if Zapata tried to collect the guns again, he would break off and fight Huerta on his own.

He was killed in January 1914, while returning from a campaign in Tepoztlan, by the Zapatista forces of Antonio Barona Rojas. According to some authors, there is strong circumstantial evidence that the killing was done on the orders of Zapata himself, although an explicit order to that effect has not been found. Barona was never held accountable for the killing.
