= Amador Salazar =

Mexican military leader (1868–1916)

Amador Salazar Jiménez
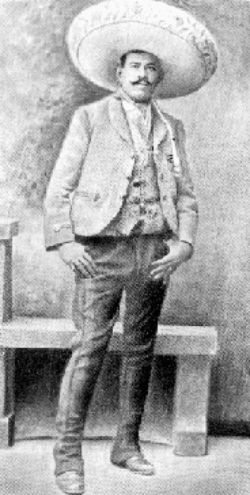
- Born: 30 April 1868; Cuernavaca, Morelos, Mexico
- Died: 16 April 1916 (aged 47) Yautepec, Morelos, Mexico
- Allegiance: Liberation Army of the South
- Service years: 1910–1916
- Rank: General
- Conflicts: Mexican Revolution

Amador Salazar Jiménez (30 April 1868 – 16 April 1916) was a Mexican military leader who participated in the Mexican Revolution.

== Early life ==
He was born in Cuernavaca, Morelos on April 30, 1868, as the son of León Salazar and Gertrudes Jiménez. He was also a cousin of Emiliano Zapata, as his father was brother to Zapata's mother, Doña Cleofas Salazar.

Before the outbreak of the revolution, Salazar worked as a laborer on the estate of the governor of Morelos and chief of staff to Porfirio Díaz, Pablo Escandón y Barrón. There, between 1903 and 1905, he helped local villagers organize in their disputes against Escandón, which led to him being drafted into the Mexican army for troublemaking. He was sent to the Riflemen's School in Mexico City.

== Mexican revolution ==
In 1910 Salazar organized his own group of guerillas and participated in the fight against the regime of Porfirio Díaz. Allied with Zapata, in 1911, he was one of the signatories of the Plan of Ayala.

When Zapata broke with Francisco Madero in 1912, Amador returned to the Morelos hills and joined Zapata, where thanks to his previous military experience his units were among the best disciplined of the Zapatistas. Amador fought against Madero and then, after Victoriano Huerta's coup d'etat, still under Zapata's command, he fought Huerta.

== On the Zapatista Junta ==
In May 1913, he was made part of the Revolutionary Junta of the Zapatistas, which was presided over by Emiliano Zapata, and also included Eufemio Zapata, Genovevo de la O, Felipe Neri, Otilio Montaño Sánchez, and Manuel Palafox (who acted as the secretary). He was in charge of reorganizing the Zapatista military structure and took part in drawing up the revolutionary goals of the movement, which included updating the Plan of Ayala to new conditions. He was also made a Divisional General in the Liberation Army of the South.

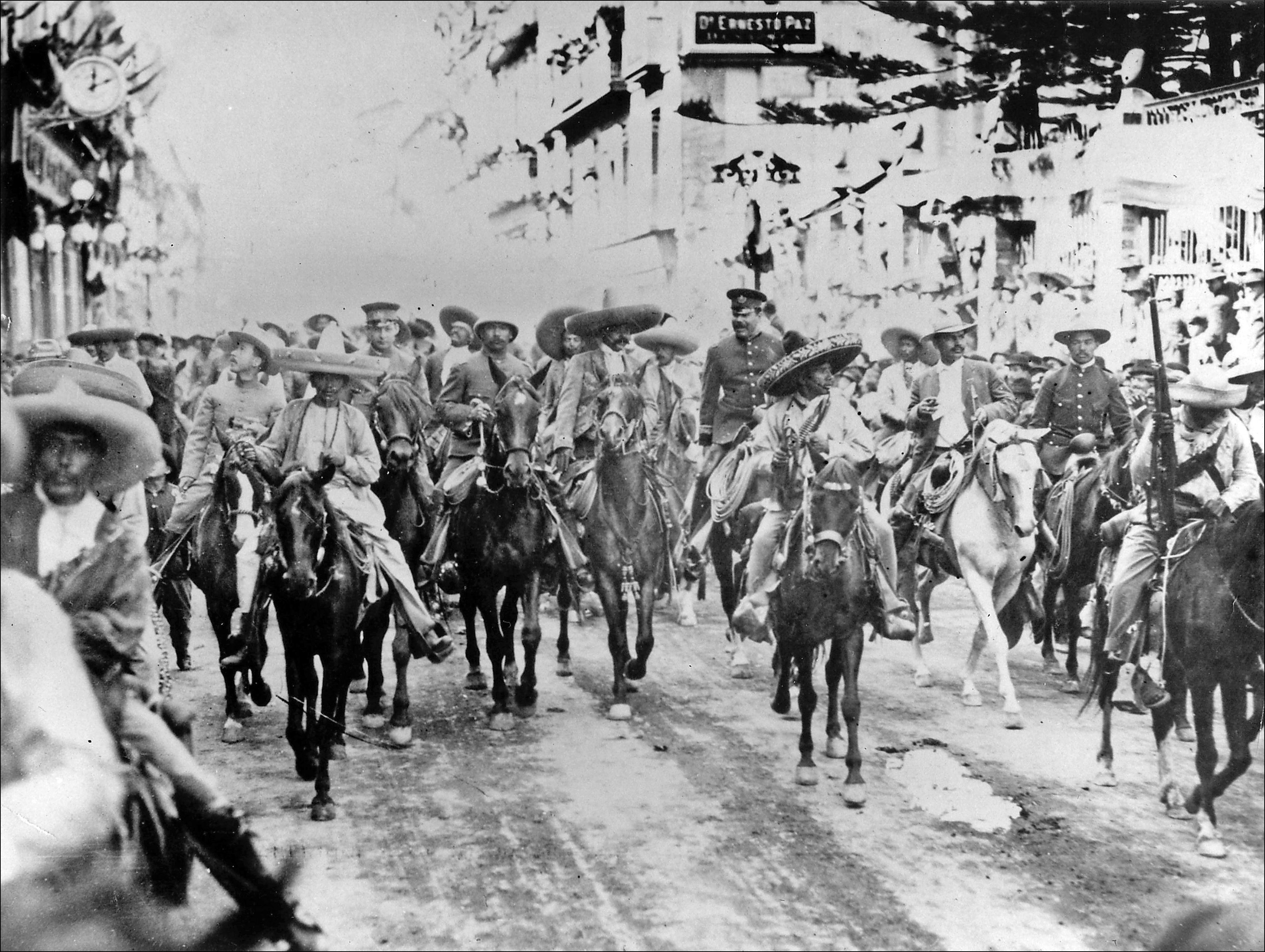
Pancho Villa and Emiliano Zapata enter Mexico City

During the first part of 1914, Salazar operated in the area near Yautepec, as part of a general successful offensive by Zapata against Huerta. However, once Huerta was defeated in July, Zapata broke with the "constitutionalist" government led by Venustiano Carranza and along with Pancho Villa began fighting against the Constitutional Army. On December 4, 1914, Amador Salazar accompanied Zapata to his famous first meeting with Villa in Xochimilco. Soon however, the Zapatistas and the Villistas had to abandon Mexico City to Carranza's general Álvaro Obregón, who reentered the city at the end of January, 1915. Salazar, leading 4000 men made an attempt to retake the capital at the end of July, but was defeated by Constitutionalist forces.

== Death and burial ==
He was killed by a stray bullet on April 16, 1916 and was buried in a pyramid shaped mausoleum in Tlaltizapán, dressed as a charro.
