= Otilio Montaño Sánchez =

Otilio Montaño
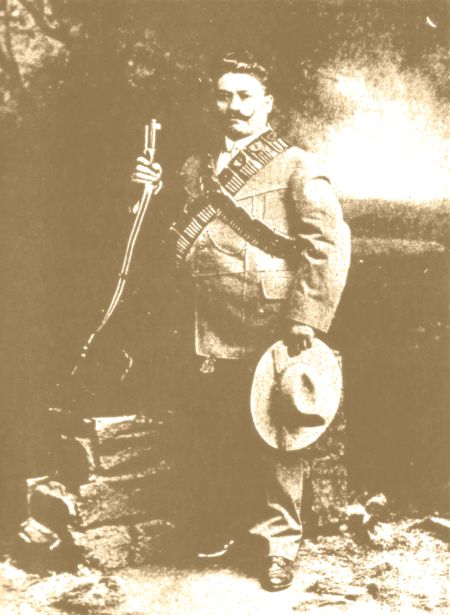
- Born: 30 December 13, 1877; Villa de Ayala, Morelos, Mexico
- Died: 16 May 18, 1917 (aged 39) Buenavista de Cuéllar, Guerrero, Mexico
- Allegiance: Liberation Army of the South
- Service years: 1910–1916
- Rank: General
- Conflicts: Mexican Revolution

Otilio Edmundo Montaño Sánchez (December 13, 1877 in Villa de Ayala, Morelos – May 18, 1917 in Buenavista de Cuéllar, Guerrero) was a Zapatista general during the Mexican Revolution.

Otilio Montaño was born in Morelos to Esteban Montaño and Guadalupe Sánchez in 1877. After finishing his studies in Cuautla he taught in schools in Tepalcingo, Jonacatepec and finally Ayala. In Yautepec he became acquainted with Emiliano Zapata's cousin, Amador Salazar. In 1910 he supported Francisco Madero in his struggle against Porfirio Díaz and eventually joined Felipe Neri and Amador Salazar in forming the Zapatista agrarian movement in Morelos. Because Montaño had some schooling and had worked as a school teacher, he was considered by the peasants of Morelos, who comprised the majority of Zapatista soldiers, as an "intellectual".

After Zapata broke with Madero, Otilio Montaño remained in Morelos and in November 1911, together with Emiliano, co-authored the famous Plan of Ayala. Zapata dictated the text of the proclamation while Otilio wrote it down and proofread it.

Subsequent to Victoriano Huerta's coup against Madero, Montaño fought against Huerta and eventually became a member of the Zapatista ruling military junta, which was presided over by Emiliano Zapata and also included Eufemio Zapata, Genovevo de la O, Felipe Neri, Amador Salazar, and Manuel Palafox (who acted as the secretary).

In December 1914, Montaño accompanied Zapata to the first meeting with Pancho Villa at Xochimilco where he gave the welcoming speech and introduced the two jefes to each other.

In early 1917 Montaño came into conflict with some of the other Zapatista generals. As a result, he was sent to the town of Buenavista de Cuellar. Soon, however, an anti-Zapata, pro-Carranza, revolt broke out in the town and Montaño was put in charge of suppressing it. Even though he had the leader of the rebellion hanged, he was accused of actually heading the rebellion. Although he vigorously denied the charges, influential Zapatistas including Manuel Palafox and Antonio Díaz Soto y Gama argued strongly that he was in fact guilty. Zapata left the matter to his advisors. A "Revolutionary Tribunal" was formed and Palafox and Soto presented evidence which was for the most part circumstantial. Montaño in turn accused the two of having betrayed the Zapatista revolution. After being found guilty, Montaño was denied last rites and had a sign hung around his neck which stated "So die all traitors to the fatherland". Palafox refused to let him die facing the firing squad, a customary courtesy usually granted to the condemned who requested it. On May 18, 1917, he was executed, proclaiming his innocence to the end.
