= Liberation Army of the South =

Armed group during the Mexican Revolution

Liberation Army of the South Zapatistas
- Ejército Libertador del Sur
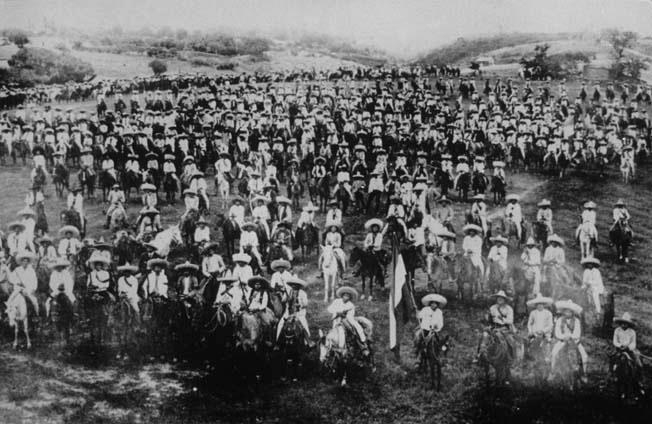
- Emiliano Zapata's Liberation Army of the South on the march in Morelos
- Leader: Pablo Torres Burgos (1911) †; Emiliano Zapata (1911–1919) †; Gildardo Magaña (1919–1920); Other commanders: Genovevo de la O; Manuel Palafox; Felipe Neri †; Otilio Montaño Sánchez †; Antonio Díaz Soto y Gama; Amador Salazar †; Eufemio Zapata †
- Dates active: 1911–1920
- Allegiance: Morelos Commune
- Headquarters: Variously Ayala or the mountains
- Active regions: Based in Morelos, with incursions into Puebla, Guerrero, and Mexico City
- Ideology: Agrarian socialism; Indigenism; Zapatismo
- Political position: Left-wing
- Size: 25,000 (1914)
- Part of: Conventionists (1914–1917)
- Wars: Mexican Revolution

The Liberation Army of the South (Spanish: Ejército Libertador del Sur, ELS) was a guerrilla force led for most of its existence by Emiliano Zapata that took part in the Mexican Revolution from 1911 to 1920. During that time, the Zapatistas fought against the national governments of Porfirio Díaz, Francisco I. Madero, Victoriano Huerta, and Venustiano Carranza. Their goal was rural land reform, specifically reclaiming communal lands (ejido) stolen by hacendados in the period before the revolution (Porfiriato).

Although rarely active outside their base in Morelos, the Zapatistas allied with Pancho Villa to support the Conventionists against the Carrancistas. After Villa's defeat, the Zapatistas remained in open rebellion. It was only after Zapata's 1919 assassination and the overthrow of the Carranza government that Zapata's successor, Gildardo Magaña, negotiated peace with President Álvaro Obregón.

== Background ==
The Zapatistas were formed in Morelos, a small and densely populated state with a largely agricultural economy. Most inhabitants lived in indigenous Nahua villages and worked common land prior to the Porfiriato; however, the completion of the Interoceanic Railway between Mexico City and Veracruz in 1891 led to significant change in the local economy. It became profitable to produce sugar for export, and these new haciendas came in conflict over land, labor, and water with the indigenous villages. Hacendado-friendly courts awarded the orchards, fields, and water sources of the villages to the haciendas. Between 1884 and 1905, eighteen towns in Morelos disappeared as lands were taken away.

Deprived of their means of subsistence, the population of Morelos was suffering from famine and general impoverishment by the turn of the century. Thousands had become wage laborers on the haciendas or left the state entirely to seek work elsewhere. In 1909, Pablo Escandón y Barrón became governor in a rigged election, siding even more aggressively with the hacendados. In response, village leaders including Emiliano Zapata, Gabriel Tepepa, and Pablo Torres Burgos formed a local defense committee. When news of Francisco Madero's Plan of San Luis Potosí reached Morelos, the committee took up arms to support his cause in February 1911.

== History ==
=== Maderista revolution and interim presidency, February–November 1911 ===
Principal battles during the fight to oust Díaz, November 1910–May 1911. Although the decisive Battle of Ciudad Juárez was fought in the north, the Zapatistas played an extremely important role in tying down Porfirian troops, since Morelos is just south of Mexico City.

The Morelos' defense committee originally aligned with Madero due to the promises of land reform in the Plan of San Luis Potosí, with Torres Burgos being appointed commanding officer; however, there was essentially no coordination with Pascual Orozco's forces in the north. They saw great early success in recruiting from among the desperate population, amassing a force of around 5,000. Governor Escandón fled the state with a portion of the federal forces, giving the rebels an opening to attack cities. In March, Torres Burgos was killed and Zapata was elected leader. He managed to avoid a trap laid by reactionary rebels under the Figueroa brothers and continue to gather strength. In May, Zapata scored a series of victories, first at Jojutla and then at Cuautla. The Battle of Cuautla was bloody and prolonged, pitting numerically superior rebels against a better-equipped and well-entrenched federal army. After suffering mass casualties from machine guns, the rebels had to take the city street by street. Nonetheless, Zapata's eventual victory put him dangerously close to the capital, and helped convince Porfirio Díaz to resign the presidency.

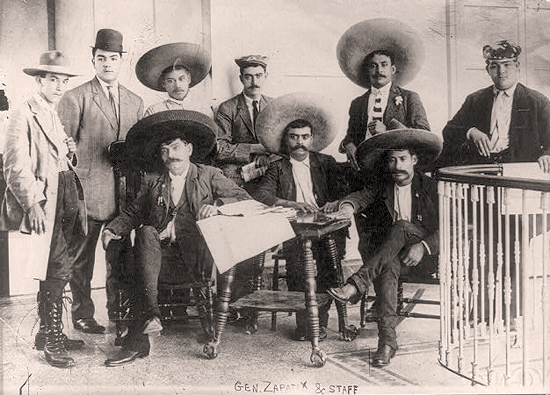
The leading commanders of the Liberation Army of the South

During the interim presidency of Francisco León de la Barra, Madero insisted Zapata disarm and disband his forces. Madero's reluctance to take action on land reform made Zapata reluctant, but he had little choice but to comply. Tensions flared when the hacendado governor attempted to block Zapata from taking up his promised position as commander of the local police. In July, news of a plot to assassinate Madero in the neighboring state of Puebla alarmed Zapata, and he rapidly re-mobilized to march to the politician's defense. Although the march was called off, Zapata and the other rebel commanders were now much more wary of laying down their arms. De la Barra ordered General Huerta to force Zapata to surrender unconditionally. Huerta quickly took over the state, and civil law was suspended in August. Although Madero attempted negotiations to avoid violence, on August 23 Huerta and Ambrosia Figueroa (now allied with the regime) began military operations against the rebels. This made them feel that Madero had betrayed them, and set the stage for their break with him three months later. The small rebel force evaded destruction by first fleeing to Puebla, then reappearing in Morelos once Huerta had moved his army to follow them. The Morelos rebels swelled to around 1,500 and by late October lay claim to important territory near Mexico City.

=== Break with Madero, Nov 1911 ===
After Madero's inauguration on November 6, it appeared as if the rebellion in Morelos could end peacefully. Negotiations in Ayala seemed to be proceeding well when the federal army under Casso Lopez suddenly surrounded Zapata's forces. Madero issued an order for Zapata to surrender with the promise the compromise would be honored. Zapata refused, as he received this order as the federal forces were already preparing to attack. His forces escaped into the Puebla mountains and there Zapata issued the Plan of Ayala, written by Otilio Montaño.

=== Revolution against Huerta, February 1913–July 1914 ===
In February 1913, Madero was assassinated and Victoriano Huerta ascended to the presidency in the Ten Tragic Days; however, Emiliano Zapata continued his rebellion under the Plan of Ayala (while expunging the name of counter-revolutionary Pascual Orozco from it), calling for the expropriation of land and redistribution to peasants. Huerta offered peace to Zapata, who rejected it. The Zapatistas thus played a remarkably similar role in the fight against Huerta as they had in the fight against Diaz, tying down Federal soldiers in the south while a rebel army marched down from the north. As the Huerta regime began to collapse, Zapata advanced. His forces took Chilpancingo in mid-March 1914; he followed this soon afterward with the capture of Acapulco, Iguala, Taxco, and Buenavista de Cuellar. Next he confronted the federal garrisons in Morelos, the majority of which defected to him with their weapons. Finally he moved against Mexico City itself.

=== Convention and civil war, 1914–1917 ===
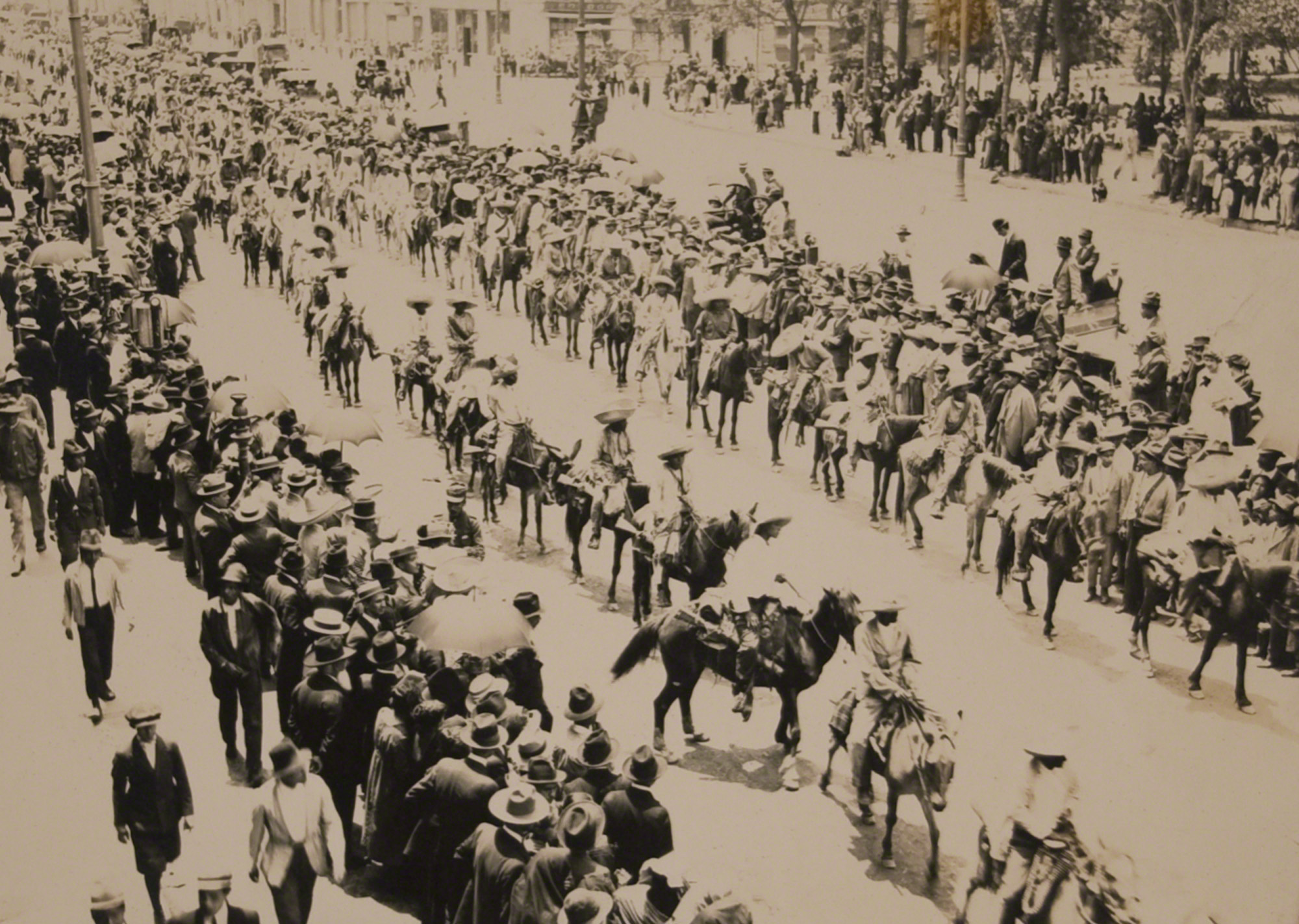
The Zapatistas briefly occupied Mexico City at the start of the civil war against Carranza. There were significant cultural clashes between the rural villagers and residents of the capital.

Rather than First Chief Carranza being named president of Mexico at the convention, General Eulalio Gutiérrez was chosen for a term of 20 days. The convention declared Carranza in rebellion against it. Civil war resumed, this time between revolutionary armies that had fought in a united cause to oust Huerta in 1913–14. Although during the Convention Constitutionalist General Álvaro Obregón had attempted to be a moderating force and had been the one to convey the convention's call for Carranza to resign, when the convention forces declared Carranza in rebellion against it, Obregón supported Carranza rather than Villa and Zapata. In 1914, Zapata met at the head of his army with Pancho Villa and his forces at Mexico City to determine the course of the revolution. In practice, the alliance between Villa and Zapata as the Army of the Convention did not continue to function when the two parted. The Zapatistas fortified themselves and focused on creating the Morelos Commune, rather than venturing out to attack the Constitutionalists.

=== Zapata's assassination and decline ===
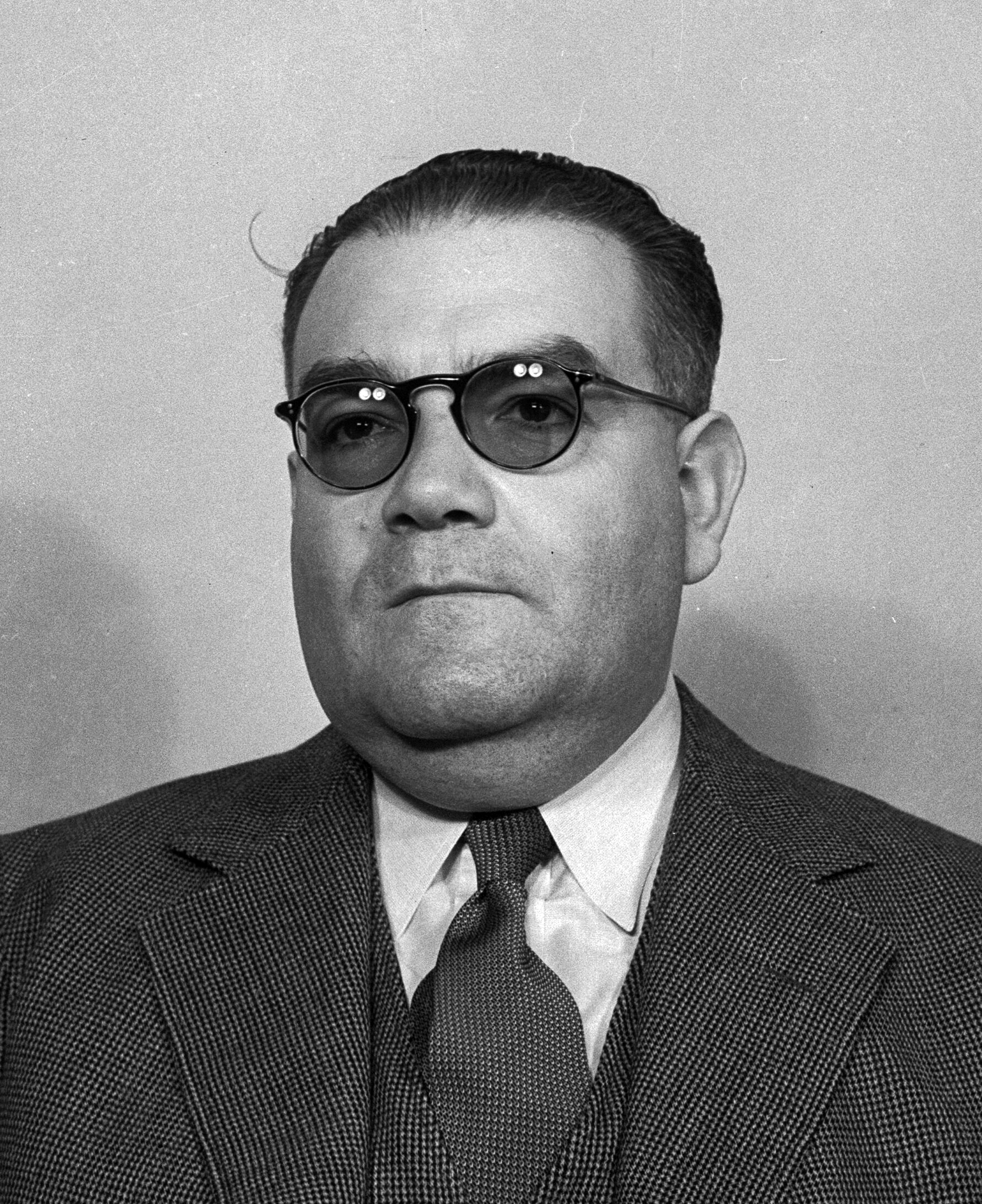
After the death of Zapata, Gildardo Magaña played a crucial role in negotiating a peaceful resolution to the conflict in Morelos.

Eliminating Zapata was a top priority for President Carranza. Carranza was unwilling to compromise with domestic foes and wanted to demonstrate to Mexican elites and to American interests that Carranza was the "only viable alternative to both anarchy and radicalism." In mid-March 1919, General Pablo González ordered his subordinate Jesús Guajardo to begin operations against the Zapatistas in the mountains around Huautla. Zapata was deceived into believing that Guajardo planned to defect, and agreed to a final meeting on 10 April 1919. When Zapata arrived at the Hacienda de San Juan, in Chinameca, Ayala, Guajardo's men riddled him with bullets. His body was photographed and his death widely publicized in an attempt to demoralize the Zapatistas.

Rebel Armies between 1916 and 1920, after the defeat of Villa

Although Zapata's assassination weakened the Liberation Army of the South, they continued the fight against Carranza. For Carranza the death of Zapata was the removal of an ongoing threat, for many Zapata's assassination undermined "worker and peasant support for Carranza and [Pablo] González." In spite of González's attempts to sully the name of Zapata and the Plan de Ayala during his 1920 campaign for the presidency, the people of Morelos continued to support Zapatista generals, providing them with weapons, supplies and protection. Carranza was wary of the threat of a U.S. intervention, and Zapatista generals decided to take a conciliatory approach. Bands of Zapatistas started surrendering in exchange for amnesties, and many Zapatista generals went on to become local authorities, such as Fortino Ayaquica who became municipal president of Tochimilco.

As Venustiano Carranza moved to curb his former allies and now rivals in 1920 to impose a civilian, Ignacio Bonillas, as his successor in the presidency, Obregón sought to align himself with the Zapatista movement against that of Carranza. Genovevo de la O and Magaña supported him in the coup by former Constitutionalists, fighting in Morelos against Carranza and helping prompt Carranza to flee Mexico City toward Veracruz in May 1920. Obregón and Genovevo de la O then entered Mexico City "in triumph". The Zapatistas were given important posts in the interim government of Adolfo de la Huerta and the administration of Álvaro Obregón, following his election to the presidency after the coup. The Zapatistas had almost total control of the state of Morelos, where they carried out a program of agrarian reform and land redistribution based on the provisions of the Plan de Ayala and with the support of the government.

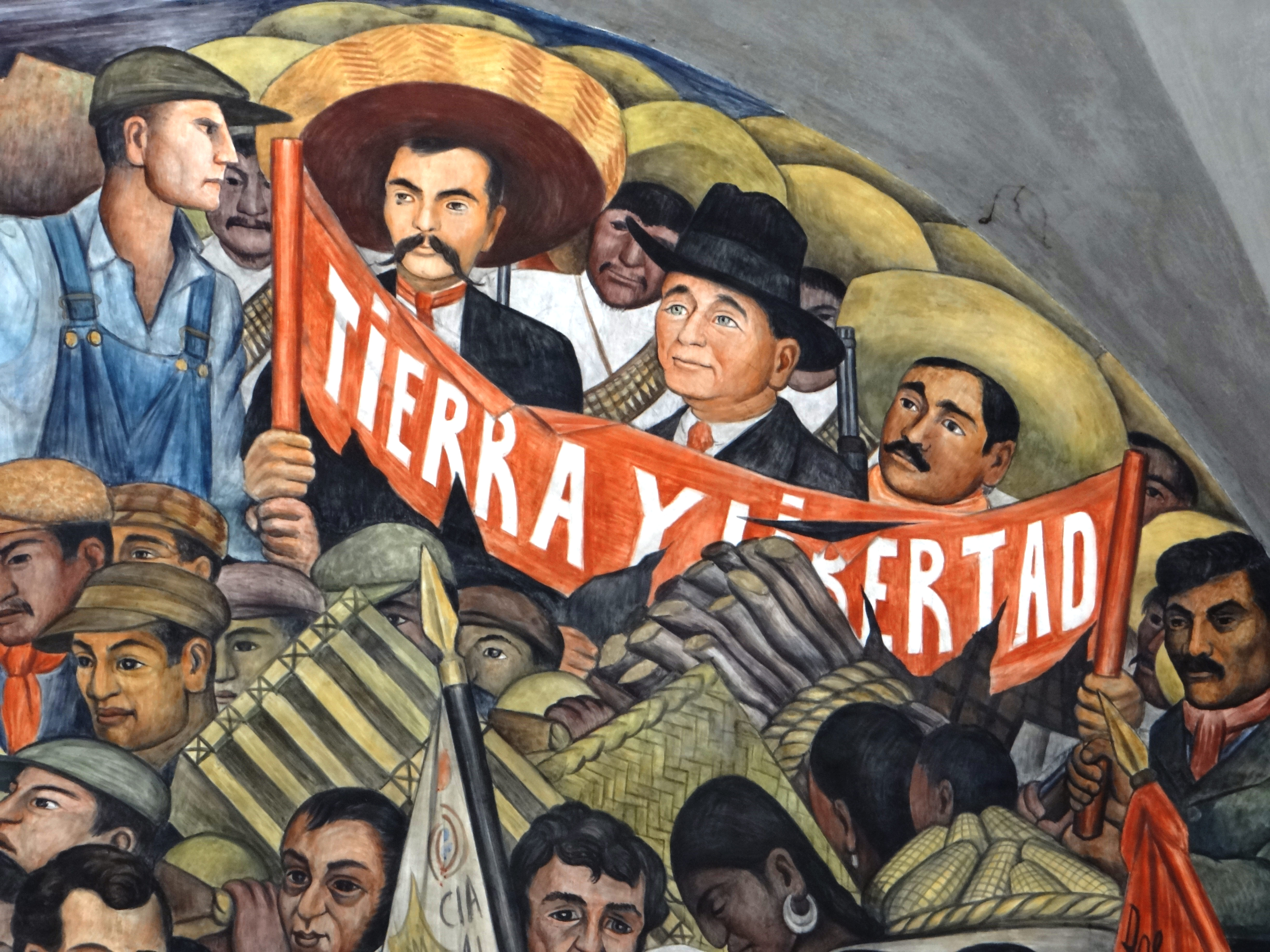
The Zapatistas have featured prominently in murals produced about the revolution, including The History of Mexico by Diego Rivera

== See also ==
- División del Norte
- List of peasant revolts
- Matlatzinca people
- Reform War

== Cited sources ==
- Brunk, Samuel (2008), The Posthumous Career of Emiliano Zapata, University of Texas Press, ISBN 9780292717800
- Katz, Friedrich (1981), The Secret War in Mexico: Europe, the United States, and the Mexican Revolution, Chicago: University of Chicago Press, ISBN 0-226-42588-6
- Knight, Alan (1986), The Mexican Revolution, vol. 1, Cambridge: Cambridge University Press, ISBN 0803277709
- Krauze, Enrique (1997), Mexico: Biography of Power, New York: HarperCollins, ISBN 9780060929176
- Womack, John Jr. (1968), Zapata and the Mexican Revolution, New York: Vintage, ISBN 978-0-394-70853-9
