= Santa María Ahuacatitlán =

- Village
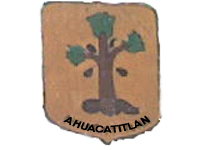
- Coat of arms

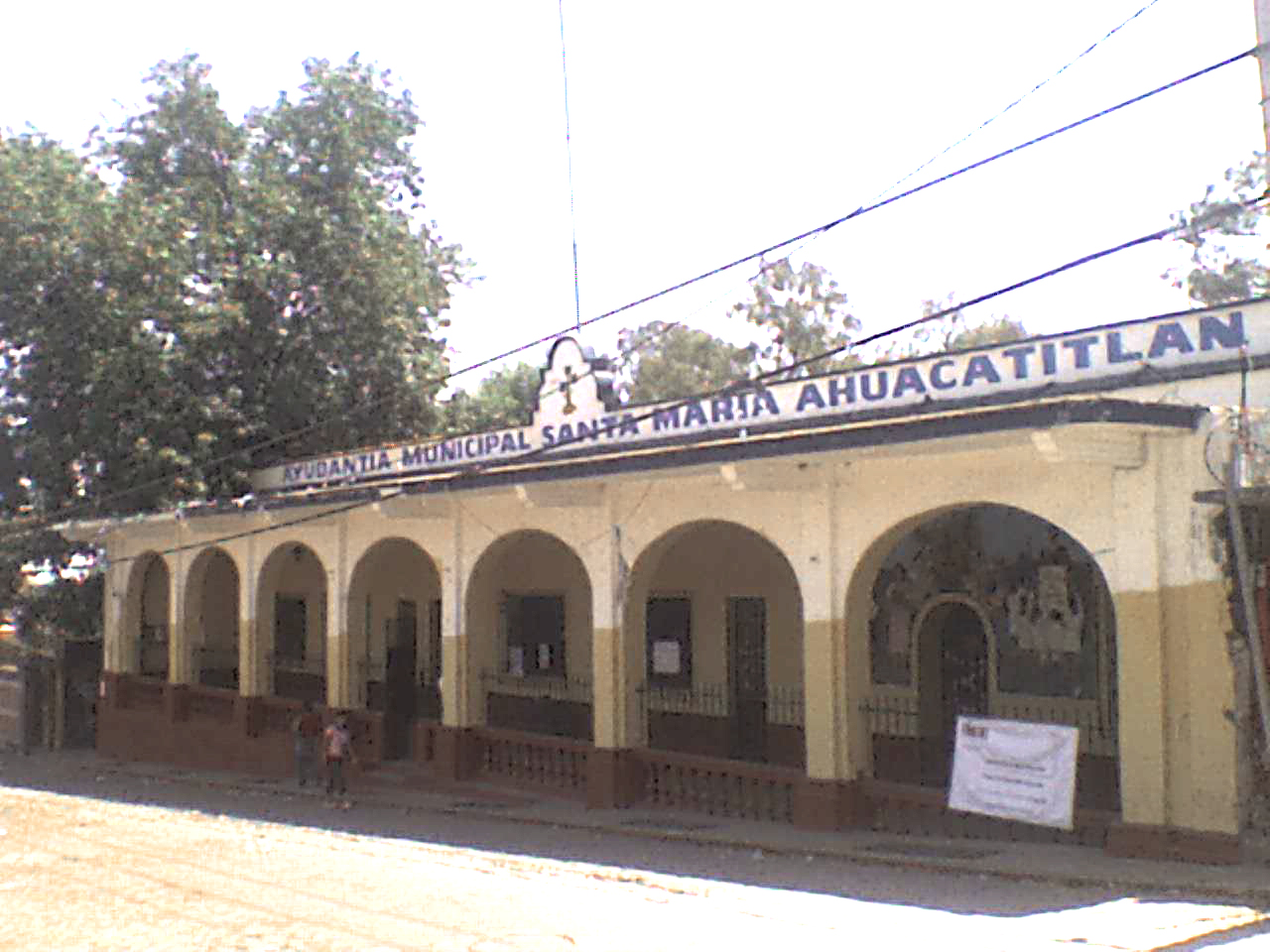

- Location in Mexico Santa María Ahuacatitlán (Mexico)
- Coordinates: 18°52′N 99°15′W
- Country: Mexico
- State: Morelos
- Elevation: 1,650 m (5,410 ft)

Population (2005)
  - Total: 8,597
- Postal code: 62100

Santa Maria Ahuacatitlán is a village in the municipality of Cuernavaca, in the state of Morelos, Mexico. Ahuacatitlán means "place among aguacates" (avocados).

== Location ==
Santa Maria Ahuacatitlán is located north of the city of Cuernavaca in Morelos. It borders Huitzilac and villages such as San Pedro Huertas to the north. On its eastern borders are the towns of Chamilpa and Ocotepec. To the south is Buena Vista, and to the east is Colonia del Bosque.

From Mexico City, the village can be reached by the Federal Mexico - Cuernavaca highway.

== History ==
According to records of the city of Cuernavaca, Santa Maria Ahuacatitlan was formed when a portion of inhabitants of Cuernavaca fled the main city upon the approach of Hernán Cortés.

Gregorio Lemercier (1912-1987), founds the monastery of Santa María de la Resurrección in 1952.

The state of Morelos and the city of Cuernavaca were hit hard by the COVID-19 pandemic in Mexico. On May 22, 2020, Santa María Ahuacatitlán reported six confirmed cases of infection. On June 6, the Comité Municipal de Contingencia COVID-19 (CMCC-19) listed the Centro, Antonio Barona, Alta Vista, Lomas de Ahuatlán, and Santa María Ahuacatitlán as the neighborhoods with the most infections. Santa María Ahuacatitlán was included in the list of high-risk neighborhoods during the pandemic in December 2020.

== Famous people ==
Genovevo de la O (1876–1952) was born in Santa María Ahuacatitlán. He fought with Emiliano Zapata and organized the Siege of Cuernavaca in 1914. He was a signer of the Plan de Ayala and fought for peasant rights his entire life. He is buried in Santa María Ahuacatitlán.

== See also ==
- Cuernavaca
- Cuernavaca Municipality
