= General Salazar =

General Salazar may refer to:

- Amador Salazar (1868–1916), Mexican military leader who served as a general in the Mexican Revolution
- José Inés Salazar (1884–1917), leading Orozquista General in the Mexican Revolution
- Julio Salazar (fl. 1990s–2000s), Peruvian Army general
