= Zapatismo =

Armed movement identified with the ideas of Emiliano Zapata

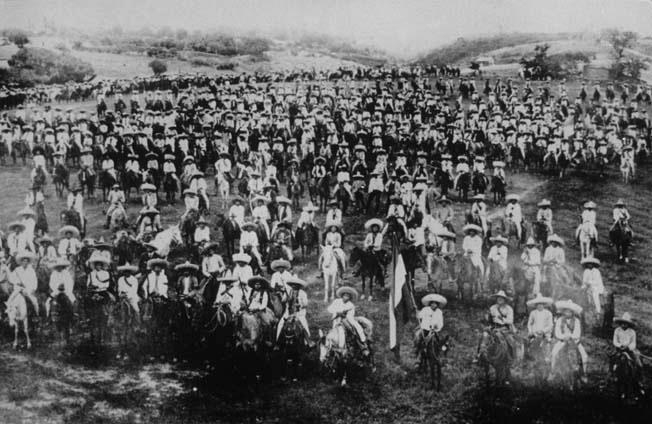
The Zapatista army

Zapatismo is the political philosophy identified with the ideas of Emiliano Zapata, one of the leaders of the Mexican Revolution, most commonly associated with the Plan of Ayala (1911). The members of the Liberation Army of the South led by Zapata were known as "Zapatistas". Zapatismo is a form of agrarian socialism.

== Background ==
The popularity of Zapata and Zapatismo resulted from the worsening economic reality of the peasantry under the rule of Porfirio Díaz. Díaz's regime would bring about the mass privatization of previously communal lands throughout Mexico which would be bought by a mix of foreign investors and local hacendados. Of particular consequence to the peasants of Zapata's home region, Morelos, was the privatization of sugar plantations and related legislation benefitting elite plantation owners, resulting in many peasants being turned into dependent workers on those plantations.

Radicalization would increase due to the Panic of 1907, which saw a significant reduction in the purchase of Mexican sugar and mining exports from industrialized nations. Within Morelos, the continued production of sugar during this period of falling demand would lead to the prices of sugar dropping drastically, contributing to Mexico's own national recession and decreased production, thus fewer job opportunities in the sugar industry. This would greatly affect lower-class peoples, leading to mass unemployment of the now landless peasantry.

== Philosophy ==
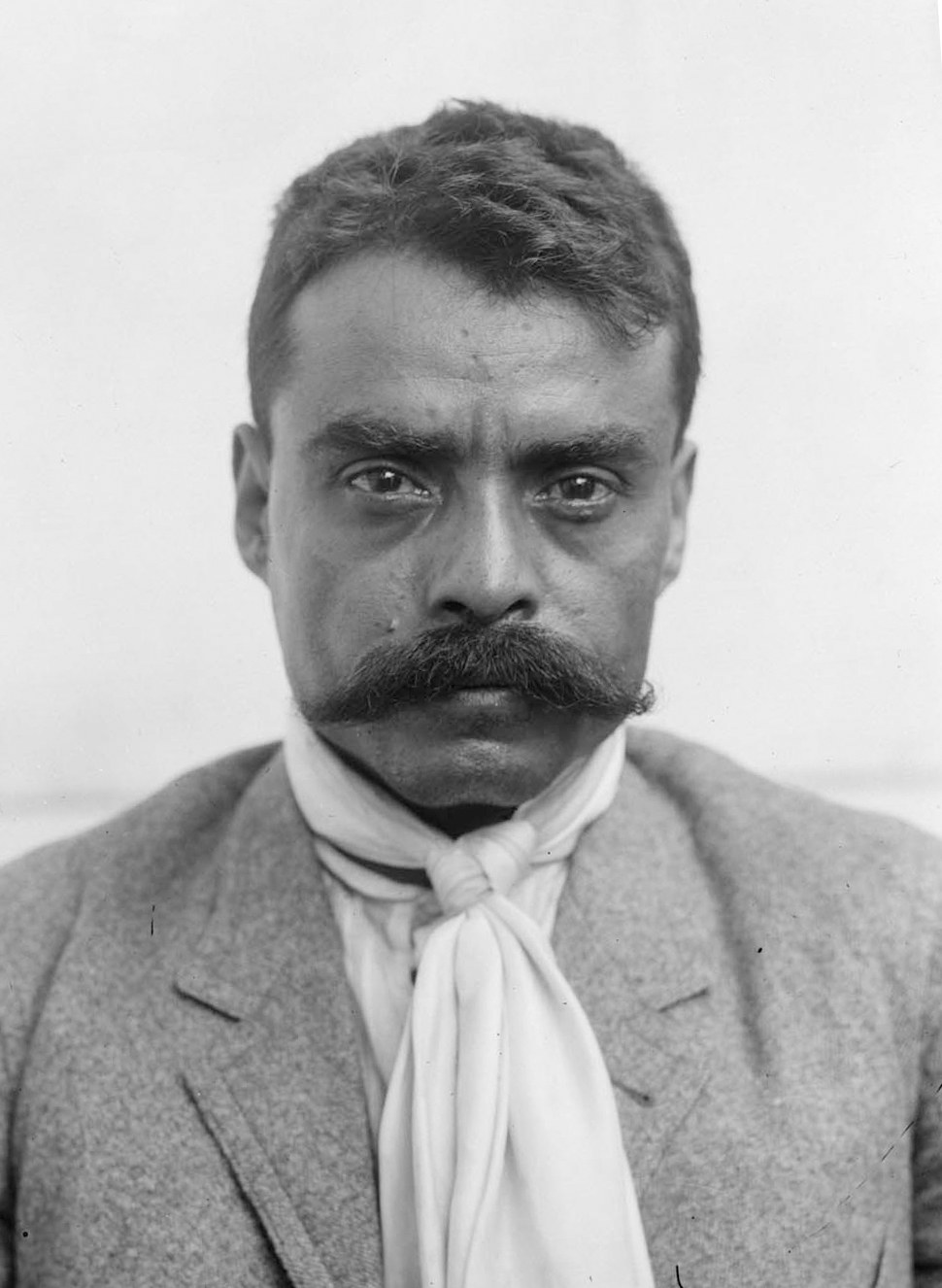
Emiliano Zapata

Zapatismo is primarily concerned with matters of land reform and land redistribution. The movement's earlier plans for land reform were detailed in the Plan of Ayala and the Agrarian Law written in 1915, signed by Manuel Palafox. Such documents confirmed the right of the citizen to be able to possess and cultivate the land, that lands were to be fairly returned to indigenous peasant farmers, villages were to retain the right to maintain ejidos. Zapatismo called for an improved system in which land claims can be processed and collective lands can be returned to their respective communities.

The particular details of land reform would change over time as Zapata's political views developed, as did that of his followers. The reform plans detailed in the Plan of Ayala sought a more limited redistribution of land from large landowners, with a one third compensation given to these wealthy owners. This contrasts with the later writing and eventual actions of Zapata, where large landholders were not compensated for land that was nationalized and made public, and the acquisition of land was larger than these initial plans laid out.

Zapatismo had a number of other major beliefs in addition to concerns of land reform and redistribution. Zapatismo valued a reformed mixed economy, with a mix of capitalist, communalist and state-run aspects. Zapatismo was also highly nationalistic, with a major platform of opposition to foreign investment within Morelos and Mexico as a whole and favoring money staying within the country, with Zapata comparing the then-current presence of wealthy nations within Mexico's industries to the historical wealth extraction conducted by Spanish colonists in New Spain. There was also an emphasis on popular government with free elections in contrast with the rule of Porfirio Díaz. Like other socialist fields of thought, Zapatismo also places value on education with Zapata enforcing mandatory education within Morelos where there was not before.

Zapata and Zapatismo primarily catered to and were most popular amongst the rural peasantry. The emphasis on land reform was most significantly geared towards helping these populations and Zapata would most frequently address rural populations and farmers within his writing. This value of agrarianism would often leave seemingly little value on urban working-class people, harming the popularity of Zapatismo among these groups.

There are several mottos associated with the movement. One motto, "Liberty, Justice, and Law," later altered to "Reform, Liberty, Justice, and Law," is believed to have been borrowed, if not heavily influenced by Ricardo Flores Magón's anarchist newspaper Regeneración. It reflected the popular phrase used by the Mexican Liberal Party, "Tierra y Libertad," in English, "Land and Liberty." Another motto associated with the movement is "Land belongs to those who plough."

== Banditry within the Movement ==
Zapatismo is also associated with banditry. It was a common tactic for Zapatista forces to ransack the wealthy land-owning elite in Mexico. Banditry within troops would become an increasing problem, something that Francisco I. Madero would call out and use as a slight against Zapata and Zapatismo as a whole. Fearing the ramifications of having a reputation as a bandit, Zapata would attempt to enforce rules barring troops from looting the poor.

== Mexican Revolution ==
During the Mexican Revolution, Zapatistas were originally independent from the Northern rebellions associated with Madero but would later join with them for the victory of the revolutionary forces. After the victory of revolutionary forces, there would be a split as the new revolutionary government under Madero would not bring about the land reform heralded by Zapatismo, with Zapata turning towards more radical local reforms and denouncing Madero's government, putting Morelos into its own rebellion against the rest of Mexico. When Victoriano Huerta attempted a military opposition to the new government, independent popular proponents of Zapatismo would provide resistance in the South of Mexico. When Huerta was defeated, another split occurred, putting Zapatismo on the side of Pancho Villa's against the forces of the victorious Venustiano Carranza. The repeated opposition by Zapata and the Zapatistas to more moderate reformers and leadership would place Zapatismo as one of the most radical major fields of thought during the revolution consistently demanding for stronger land reform and stronger resistance to foreign investment.

During the Mexican Revolution, followers of Zapatismo would find themselves aligned with the Conventionalists in opposition to the Constitutionalists. Despite this opposition, certain Constitutionalist principles have their origins within Zapatismo. The Constitutionalists own platform for land reform was inspired from Zapatismo though they differed in views of implementation.

Zapatismo thought had a much more significant influence in the Mexican Revolution than the actual direct rule of Emiliano Zapata and the military influence of the Zapatistas. The governance of Zapata and explicit Zapatismo law was restricted to his home region of Morelos. The Zapatista's army was one of the worse off of the major military forces of the revolution, this lack of military strength within the Zapatistas compared to other Mexican forces would be a major weakness for the Zapatismo movement at the time and lead to their eventual loss and death of Zapata but would not prevent certain aspects of their beliefs in land reform from being popular throughout the country.

The ideals of Zapatismo were mocked and frowned upon by Francisco I. Madero, who gave permission for the Plan of Ayala to be published so that, "everyone will know how crazy that Zapata is." Zapatismo clashed with the ideologies of Venustiano Carranza and Francisco I. Madero because it was antithetical to the idea that the Mexican Revolution was the creation of the urban working class.

Zapatismo belief would have a significant influence on the making of the Mexican Constitution in spite of the Zapatistas losing militarily due to the prevalence of Zapatismo within the nation. Article 27 in particular would accomplish one of the many goals of Zapatismo. It mandated the return of the lands that were privatized and taken under the control of Porfirio Díaz. It also stated that land can be taken away if it wasn't put to good use and be given to the public instead. Article 123 included labor rights for all workers, child labor laws, and laws protecting women in the workplace.

== After Zapata's assassination ==
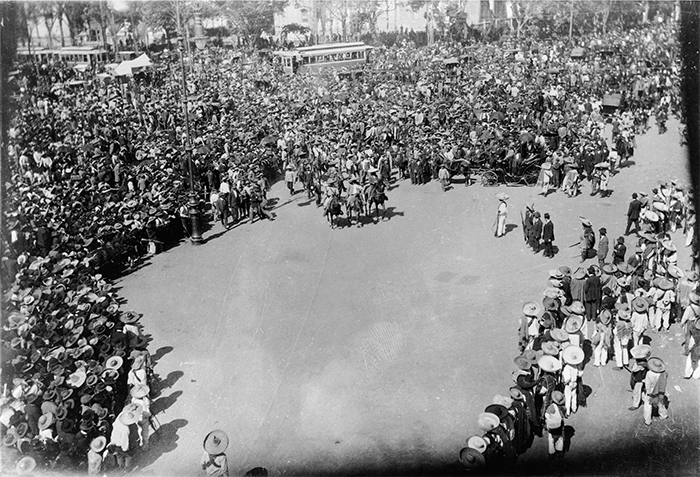
Zapatistas in Zócalo

Zapatismo continued after the assassination of Emiliano Zapata in 1919. Many of the remaining Zapatistas continued to fight Venustiano Carranza's forces, others surrendered peacefully in exchange for amnesties. In 1920, Álvaro Obregón sided with the Zapatistas in a coup against Venustiano Carranza's government. This led to the installation of agrarian reforms in the state of Morelos.

Emiliano Zapata became a national hero after his death. The face of Emiliano Zapata became representative of Zapatismo as a whole and his image would be called upon whenever land reform was brought to the table.

After Mexico signed the North American Free Trade Agreement, the Zapatista Army of National Liberation (EZLN) would declare war on the Mexican government. Their ideology (Neozapatismo) would be similar to the original Zapatismo of the Mexican Revolution but includes additional feminist and anti-neoliberal sentiments.

== See also ==
- Agrarianism
- Agrarian Socialism
- Economic history of Mexico
- Mexican Revolution
- Neozapatismo
- Plan of Ayala
