= Lagunas de Zempoala National Park =

National park in Mexico

- IUCN category II (national park)
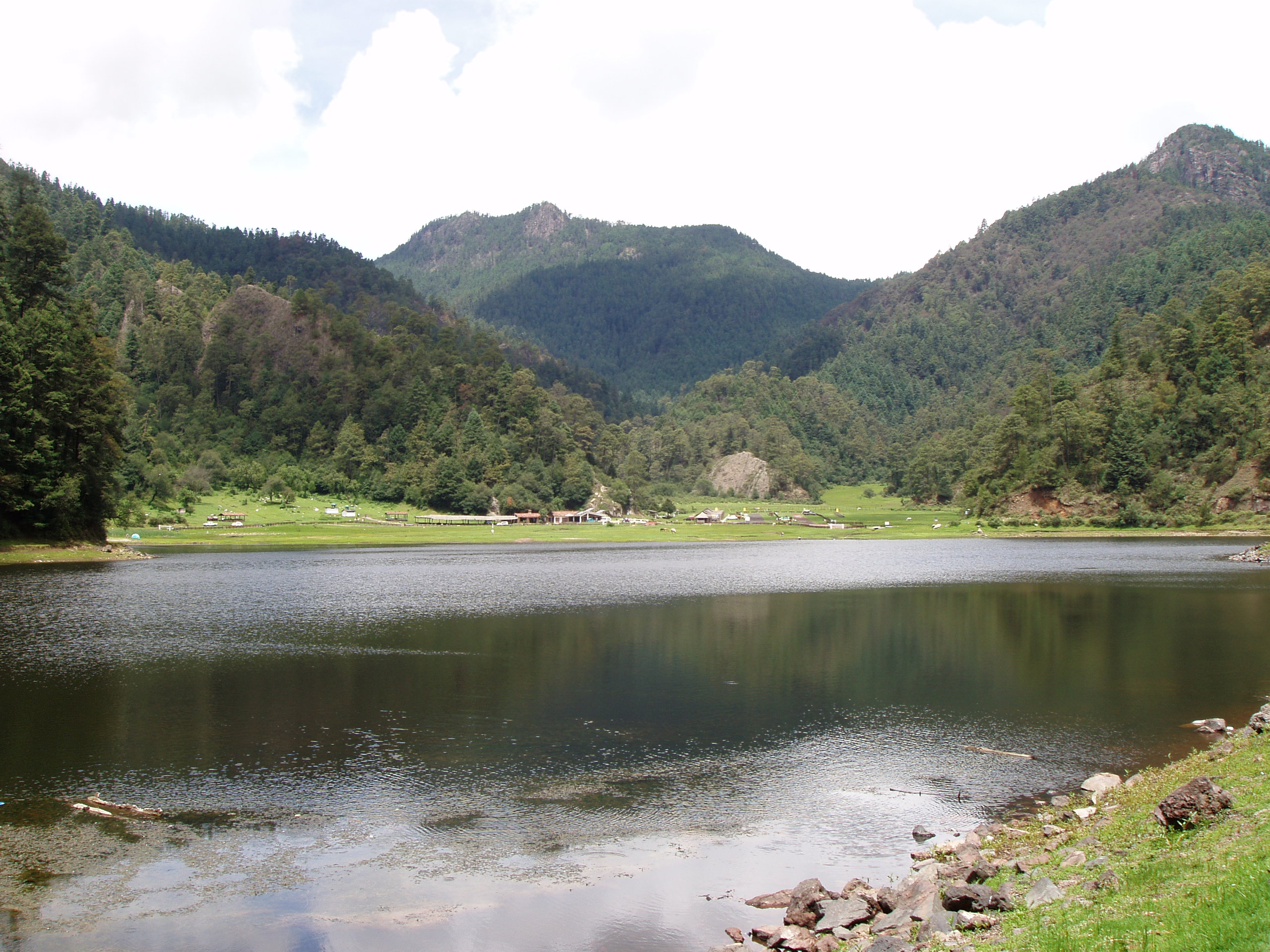

- Location within Mexico
- Location: Ocuilan, State of Mexico / Huitzilac, Morelos
- Nearest city: Mexico City
- Coordinates: 19°03′21″N 99°19′12″W
- Area: 4,790 hectares (11,800 acres)
- Established: November 27, 1936
- Governing body: Secretariat of the Environment and Natural Resources

Lagunas de Zempoala National Park is a natural protected area in Mexico that consists of a group of seven lagoons. In Nahuatl language, "Zempoala" means "place of many waters". The park is located between the state of Morelos and the state of Mexico.

== Geography ==
The lagoons of Zempoala are located in a biological corridor named Chichinautzin, between the municipalities of Ocuilan, at the southwestern end of the state of Mexico, and Huitzilac, in the northwestern section of the state of Morelos, 50 km away from Mexico City.

The National Park covers about 4,700 hectares (12,000 acres) and lies at an elevation of about 2,900 meters (9,500 feet) above sea level.

== The Park ==
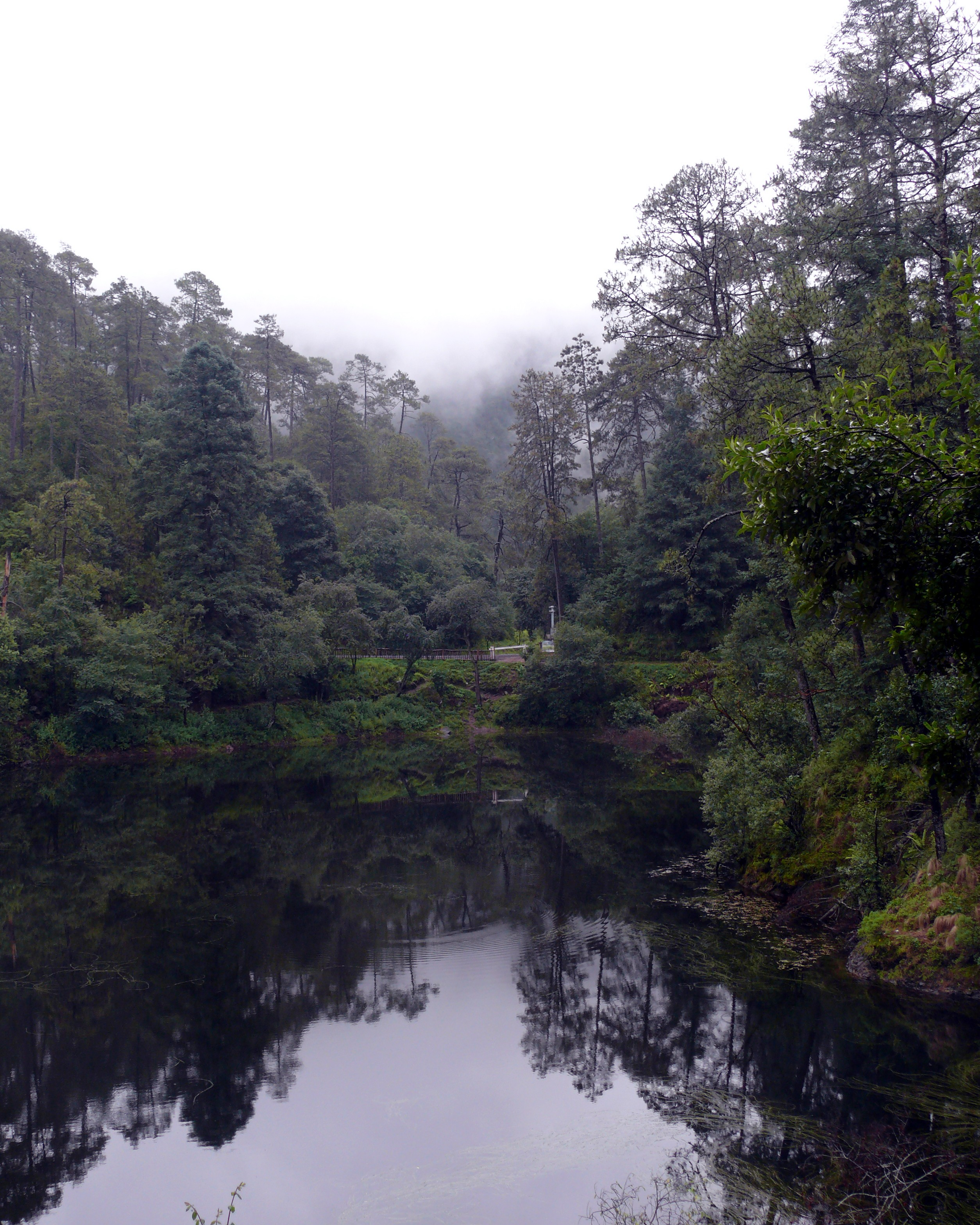
Plant life near one of the lakes

The Park consists of seven lagoons: Zempoala, Compila, Tonatihua, Seca, Ocoyotongo, Quila, and Hueyapan which are supplied with water through rain and the rivers descending from the Ajusco and the surrounding mountains. Three of the lagoons (Zempoala, Tonatihua, and Prieta) have water the whole year, and the other four are seasonal.

== Flora and fauna ==
The abundant forests surrounding the park include different types of trees such as oaks, cedars, pine trees and firs. In the park there is a possibility of finding a great variety of mammals such as deer, foxes, weasels, rabbits, squirrels, skunks, birds (such as falcons, hummingbirds and sparrows), and amphibians such as the Axolotl.

== Decree ==
The Zempoala lagoons were granted the title of national park on November 27, 1936, by President Lázaro Cárdenas, and the decree was modified in May 1947 to reduce the park's territory to its current 4,700 hectares.
