= Huautla, Morelos =

Town in Morelos, Mexico

Coordinates: 18.4400°N 99.0247°W

Huautla is a small town in the Mexican state of Morelos, in the municipality of Tlaquiltenango. Revolutionary General Gildardo Magaña Cerda (1891-1939) was proclaimed successor of Emiliano Zapata to the leadership of the Liberation Army of the South near this town on 1919-09-04.

In 2005, the population of Huautla was 852. It is located at an altitude of 970 meters ( feet) above sea level. The fertility rate in 2005 was 4.25 children/woman. 98% of the 381 dwellings had electricity, 92% had televisions, 5% had a personal computer, 3% had Internet access, 53% had a landline telephone, 3% had a cell phone, and 90% had a restroom or toilet. The postal code is 62990. There is one preschool, one elementary school (grades 1–6), one middle school (grades 7–9), one high school (grades 9–12), and one school for adult education. It is 45.6 km (28.3 miles) from the municipal seat of Tlaquiltenango.

The town of Huautla is near the Sierra de Huautla range, which in turn gives its name to the Sierra de Huautla Biosphere Reserve. This is the largest protected area in central Mexico, established on July 10, 1999, and declared a biosphere reserve by UNESCO in 2006. It covers 59,031 hectares (145,869 acres) in the Balsas River Basin where sustainable development is promoted through eco-tourism, camping, visits to mines, hiking, visits to caves (with prehispanic paintings), and scientific studies under the auspices of the Universidad Autónoma del Estado de Morelos. There are 85 species of fishes, 209 species of birds, 69 species of large mammals (including white-tail deer, boars, raccoons, and coyotes. There are reptiles, amphibians, and over 1,000 species of insects. Pine and oak forests dominate the area, although there are also many species of cacti.

== See also ==
- List of people from Morelos
