= Buenavista de Cuéllar (municipality) =

Municipality in the Mexican state of Guerrero

- Municipality
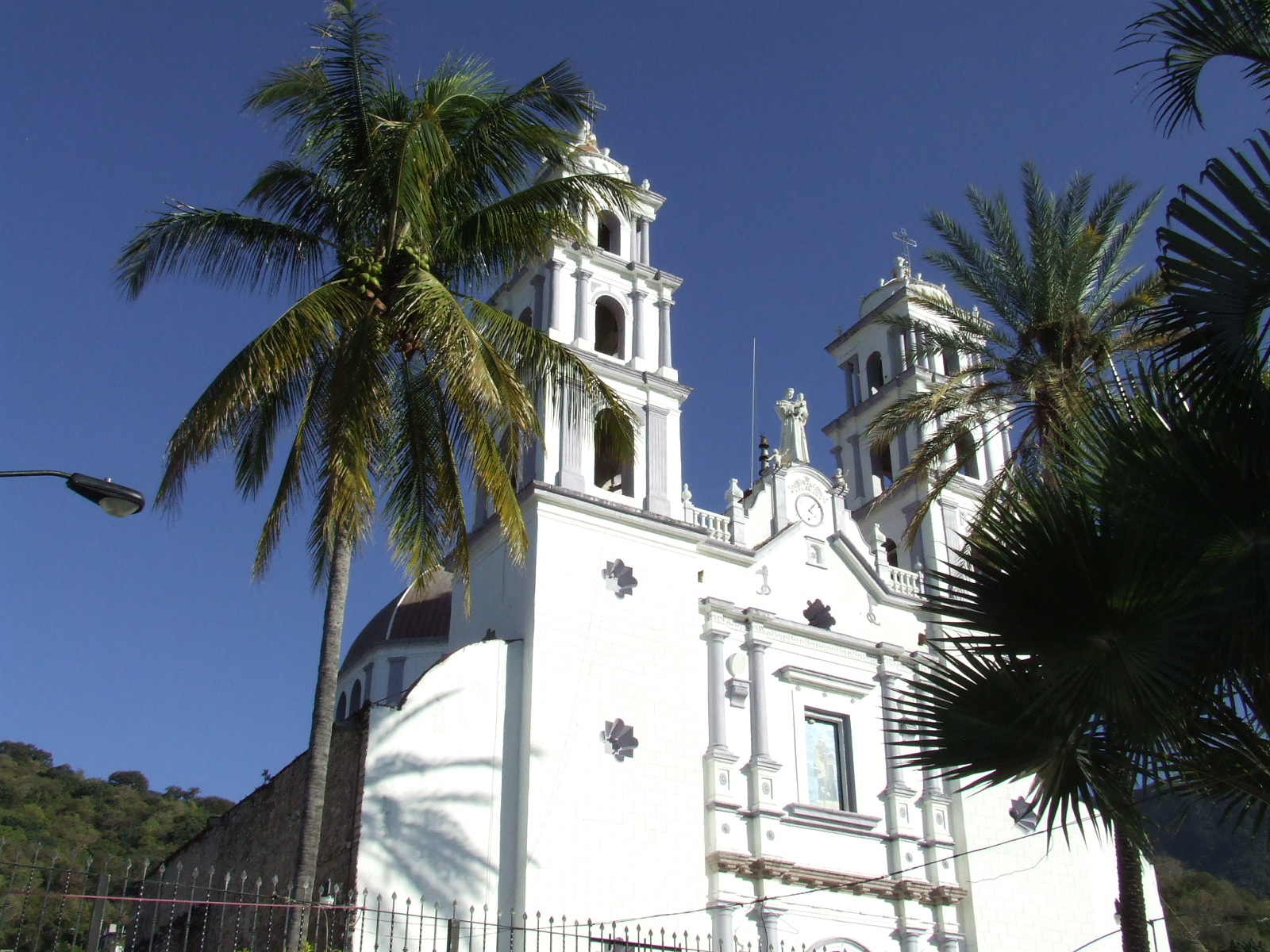
- Parish of Saint Anthony of Padua in Buenavista de Cuéllar.

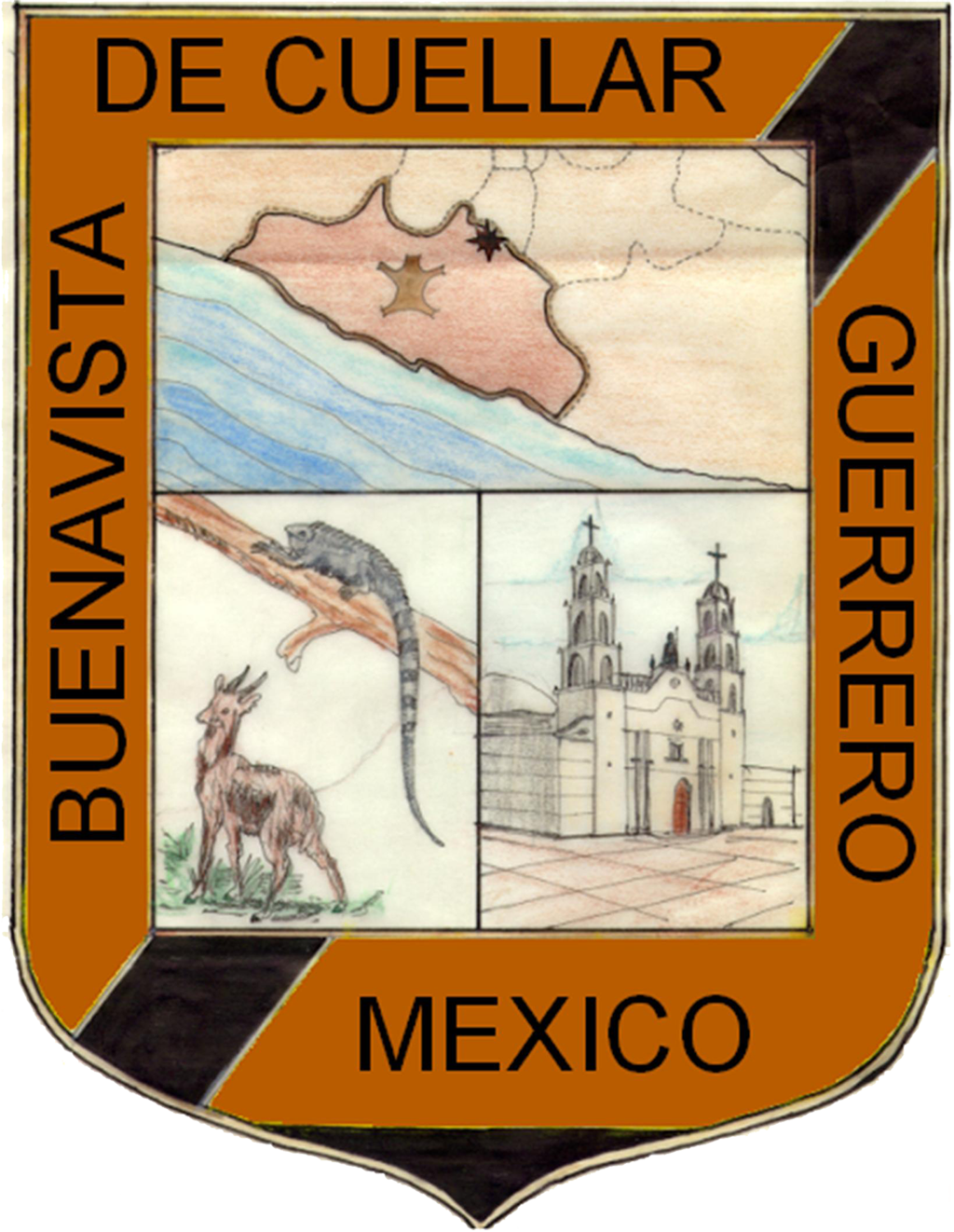
- Coat of arms

- Location in Mexico
- Coordinates: 18°28′N 99°32′W
- Country: Mexico
- State: Guerrero
- Municipal seat: Buenavista de Cuéllar

Area
  - Total: 338.1 km^{2} (130.5 sq mi)

Population (2005)
  - Total: 12,148

Buenavista de Cuéllar is a municipality in the Mexican state of Guerrero. The municipal seat is Buenavista de Cuéllar. The municipality covers an area of 338.1 km^{2}.

In 2005, the municipality had a total population of 12,148.
