= Huitzilac =

City in Morelos, Mexico

- City and municipality
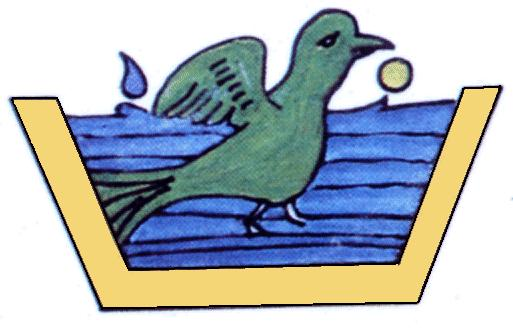
- Coat of arms

- Location within Morelos Location within Mexico
- Coordinates: 19°01′42″N 99°16′02″W
- Country: Mexico
- State: Morelos
- Elevation: 2,561 m (8,402 ft)

Population (2020)
  - Total: 5,347
  - Municipality: 24,515
- Time zone: UTC-6 (Zona Centro)

Huitzilac is a city and municipality in the Mexican state of Morelos. It stands at 19°01′42″N 99°16′02″W and at an altitude of 2,561 m (8,402 ft) above sea level.

The city serves as the municipal seat for the surrounding municipality of the same name. With a 2020 census population of 5,347 inhabitants, it is the second-largest city (locality) in the municipality, after the town of Tres Marías.

The municipality reported 24,515 inhabitants in the 2020 census.

The name is a Spanish-language adaptation of a Nahuatl toponym meaning "in the water of the humming-birds".

== The municipality ==
The municipality is one of 17 municipalities that border Mexico City. It borders the capital city's southside boroughs of Milpa Alta and Tlalpan. Ulises Pardo Bastida of Juntos Haremos Historia (Together we will make history coalition) was elected municipal president (mayor) in the election of July 1, 2018.

=== Towns and villages ===
The largest localities (cities, towns, and villages) are:

Name	2010 Census Population
Tres Marías	6,160
Huitzilac	4,568
Coajomulco	2,089
Real Montecassino	364
Fraccionamiento Sierra Encantada	349
Total Municipality	17,340

== History ==
During the Prehispanic era, Huitzilac was a part of the domain of Cuahanahuac (Cuernavaca). After the Conquest (1521), it became a part of the Marquesado del Valle de Oaxaca. The town was an important stagecoach stop on the route from Mexico City to Cuernavaca, but this changed with the construction of the railroad in 1897. huitzilac (Dec 14, 2018)

During the Revolution, General Genovevo de la O fought against the government. Huitizlac was burned in April 1912, and de la O was able to mobilize 4,000 men plus artillery to join in the fight to liberate Cuernavaca. Thanks to the popularity of the Ejército Libertador del Sur in this region, Huitizalc and Santa María Ahuacatitlán were able to forget their old rivalries.

Iron crosses have been erected at Km 47 of the federal Mexico City-Cuernavaca highway to commemorate Francisco R. Serrano and his associates, Daniel and Miguel A. Peralta, Carlos Ariza, Carlos Vidal, Rafael Martínez de Escobar, Cecilio González, Enrique Monteverde, Alonso Capetillo Robles, Augusto Peña, Antonio Jáuregui, José Valle Arce, Octavio Almada, and Ernesto Noriega Méndez. On October 3, 1927, Serrano (a candidate for president) and his men were assassinated on the orders of President Álvaro Obregón. Martín Luis Guzman describes the incident in his novel, La sombra del caudillo.

On June 18, 2019, twelve Federal Police agents were sentenced to 34 years of prison for the August 24, 2012 murder of two CIA agents in Tres Marías.

As of May 4, 2020, there were 505 infections and 59 deaths in the state of Morelos and four confirmed infections from the COVID-19 pandemic in Huitzilac. Schools and many businesses were closed from mid March until June 1. On June 2, Huitzilac reported eleven confirmed cases and three deaths from the virus; the reopening of the state was pushed back until at least June 13. Toxic medical waste was found at Km 49 of the Mexican Federal Highway 95D near the monument to Josė María Morelos y Pavón in Tres Marias; four toll collectors who work for Federal Roads and Bridges and Related Services, (CAPUFE) in Morelos have died from the coronavirus. Huitzilac reported 30 cases, 24 recuperations, and six deaths from the virus as of August 31. Sixty-four cases were reported on December 27, 2020.

== Tourist Attractions ==
- Tres Marías (Three Marys mountain) and its restaurants. The town is also a popular meeting point for motorcyclists, especially on weekends.
- Chichinautzin Biological Corridor. The Ajusco Chichinautzin Biological Corridor is a protected natural area with a remarkable diversity of habitats and species due to its privileged geographic and climatic conditions. In the Chichinautzin Corridor there are 315 species of fungi (more than 80 edible), 10 species of amphibians, 43 species of reptiles, 1,348 species of insects and spiders, 237 of birds (36 exclusive to this region), 5 species of fish, 785 of plants, and 7 types of vegetation in addition to forests of pine, oyamel and oak. The corridor includes the second and third highest peaks in Morelos: Sierra Chichinautzin 3,930 metres (12,890 ft) and Los Cumbres/Tres Marias 3,940 metres (12,930 ft)
- Lagunas de Zempoala National Park. Visitors can fly kites, hike, camp, and ride horses.
- Food: Barbacoa (barbecue mutton) and pulque (a beer-like drink made from fermented mezcal).
- Iglesia de San Juan Bautista (Church of St. John the Baptist), built 1623. There are two festivals: June 24 and September 1.
- La Pera lookout on the Mexico City-Cuernavaca tollway.
- Handicrafts: wooden furniture
- Los Columpios (The swings). Visitors of all ages will enjoy the day on the rope swings in this park. Picnicking and camping allowed. You can rent ARVs or go on a zip-line. Restaurant and convenience store.
- Monument to José María Morelos. This monument to the Hero of Independence for whom the state is named is located at Km 46.9 of the Mexico City-Cuernavaca highway, which opened in 1952. The original 7-meter stone statue was designed by Everardo Hernández in 1954, but this was demolished and replaced with a bronze statue by Ernesto Tamariz, Artemio Silva, and Eduardo Tamariz in 1986. The statue was severely vandalized in December 2012.

== Culture ==
The most important festival in Huitzilac is celebrated on March 19, in honor of the town's patron saint, San José. An image of St. Joseph disappeared from the church during the Mexican Revolution and was recovered on September 1, 1921, so there is a festival to remember this event. There are also celebrations during Holy Week (March or April) and in honor of Our Lady of Guadalupe on December 12. The Holy Trinity is celebrated in Fierro del Toro on January 1. San Buen Aventura is celebrated on July 15 in Coajomulco. St. Joseph is also honored in Tres Marias on March 19.

=== Traditions ===
Pulque and cured fruit drinks are prepared in the area. Local craftsmen make wooden furniture. Chinelos dance at local festivals.

== Geography ==
morelos.gob/huitzilac Huitzilac has an area of 190 km^{2} (73 miles^{2}), which represents 3.84% of the territory in the state. The average altitude is 2,500 m (8,200 ft.) above sea level.

=== Climate ===
The municipality has a subtropical humid climate with a well-defined winter. The average annual temperature is 12 °C (53.6 °F) and the average annual precipitation is 1,358 mm (53.4").

=== Terrain ===
There are many mountain peaks in the area, 2,250 or more meters above sea level.

- Volcán Ocotecatl, 19°05'N 99°02'W, 3,480 m
- Sierra Chichinautzin: 3,470 m (11,398 ft.)
- Volcán Chalchihuites: 3,440 m
- Cerro de Tres Marías: 3,280 m (10,761 ft.)
- Volcán Cuespalapa, Tres Marias: 3,270 m
- Cerros de Tepeyahualco, Tuxtepec: both over 3,250 m (10,663 ft.)
- Cerro de la Manteca: 3,200 m (10,500 ft.)
- Cerro de Tezoyo: 3,180 m
- Cerros de Zacolocohaya, del Mirador, de Piedra Quila, de Zempoala, de Ojo de Arezacapa: all over 3,000 m (9,840 ft.)

=== Lakes & Rivers ===
The Lakes of Zempoala and several intermittent streams.Exploring Mexico: Zempoala

=== Soil ===
Land use

- 3,035 ha (7,500 acres) for agriculture
- 3,051 ha (7,539 acres) for fishing
- 7,002 ha (17,302 acres) for forest

Land distribution

- 440 ha (1,087 acres) ejidos
- 19,388 ha (47,909 acres) communal property
- 9,693 ha (23,952 acres) private land

=== Flora & Fauna ===
The flora consists mostly of oak and pine forests. The fauna includes white-tail deer, raccoons, skunks, squirrels, volcano rats, mountain lions, quail, mountain hens, woodpeckers, blue magpies, goldfinches, rattlesnakes, garter snakes, frogs, and lizards. Trout live in the streams.

== See also ==
- Mexican Revolution
- List of people from Morelos
- Governors of Morelos
- Genovevo de la O
- Lagunas de Zempoala National Park
- Morelos
