= Gildardo Magaña =

Mexican politician

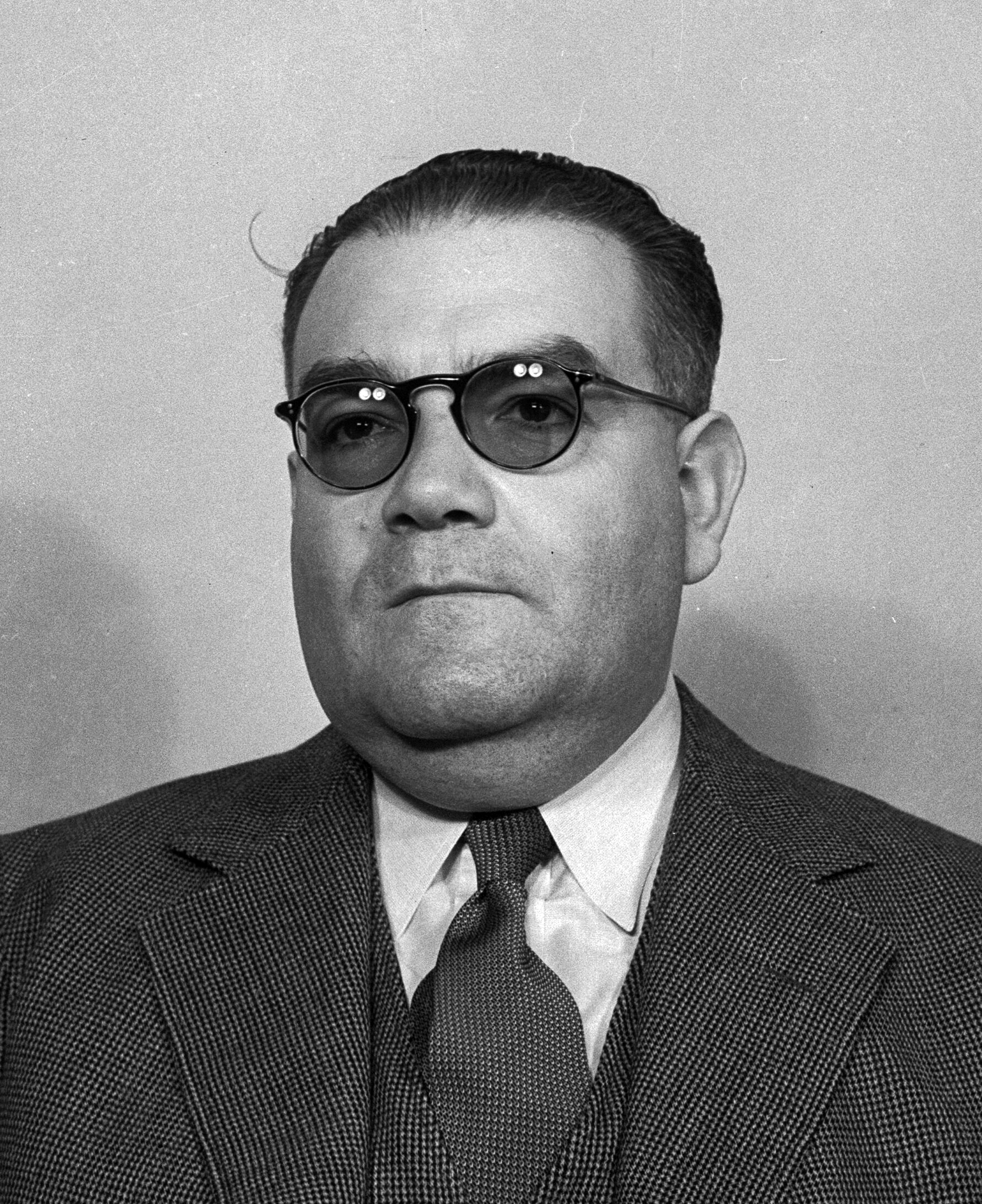
- Gildardo Magaña Cerda
- Born: Gildardo Magaña Cerda; March 7, 1891; Zamora, Michoacán, Mexico
- Died: December 13, 1939 (aged 48); Mexico
- Military career
- Allegiance: Mexico
- Branch: Mexican Army
- Rank: General
- Conflicts: Mexican Revolution

Gildardo Magaña Cerda (March 7, 1891 – December 13, 1939) was a Mexican general, politician and revolutionary.

Born on March 7, 1891, in Zamora, Michoacán to a Liberal trading family, Magaña was sent to study economics in the United States at the Temple College in Pennsylvania. Back in Mexico he was involved in the anti-reelectionist movement and had to flee to the insurrectionist Zapatista country people in Morelos in 1911. He was immediately made use of as emissary to various revolutionaries in different parts of Mexico, among others to Pancho Villa whom he is reported to have taught reading. In 1916 he was appointed chief of staff to Emiliano Zapata, because he was the only one who was able to make unruly sub-commanders of the movement cooperate instead of quarrel, using his personal charm as well as his outstanding diplomatic skill for the task.

When Zapata was killed in 1919, Magaña was elected his successor with 18 votes against 11 for Jesús Capistrán. As commander-in-chief of the Zapatist army, he made it his supreme business to achieve a durable peace. To that purpose he cultivated various possible allies, in vain until Álvaro Obregón revolted in 1920. Magaña immediately declared his and his movement's support and provided Obregón with the army with which he conquered Mexico D.F. In return, the movement got the Ministry of Agriculture and its desired agrarian reform made law.

Under Obregón's and his successors' presidencies, Magaña held several high military commands but also found time to found the Confederación Nacional Agraria, the Cardenist peasants’ union. In 1936 he was elected governor of his native state of Michoacán, a post he held until his death (by a heart attack) in 1939. Shortly before his death he was suggested as a candidate for Lázaro Cárdenas's successor as president but declined.

In March 1911, he participated in the Tacubaya conspiracy. When it was discovered, he fled to Morelos, where he joined the regionalist movement led by Emiliano Zapata. In May, he participated in the siege and capture of Cuautla, where Emiliano Zapata awarded him the rank of lieutenant colonel, with which he was permanently incorporated into the Southern Liberation Army.

== National Army ==
In November 1919, due to the international conflict with the United States caused by the kidnapping of Consul Jenkins, Magaña and other southern chiefs accepted the amnesty of Venustiano Carranza's government, thinking of putting himself in defense of the nation that was threatened by a North American invasion. In January 1920 he took up arms again, probably at the suggestion of Álvaro Obregón and shortly after it joined the Plan of Agua Prieta. Upon his victory, the Liberation Army of the South was merged into the Mexican Army through two divisions. Magaña obtained the rank of Divisionario and became the commander of the Second Division of the South. Genovevo de la O became the first. He also intervened as a mediator to get the surrender of Francisco Villa, which was achieved on June 28, 1920.

== Literature ==
- John Womack: Zapata and the Mexican revolution, Vintage 1968.

== Collection ==
The Gildardo Magaña Cerda archive was donated by his brother Octavio and contains documents from the Zapatista movement and over four thousand photographs. It was kept at the UNAM Institute of Historical Research between 1961 and 1962, and later became part of the UNAM Historical Archive in the following decade.

== See also ==
- Huautla, Morelos
- List of people from Morelos
- List of governors of dependent territories in the 20th century
