= Adolfo Gilly =

Mexican historian and author (1928–2023)

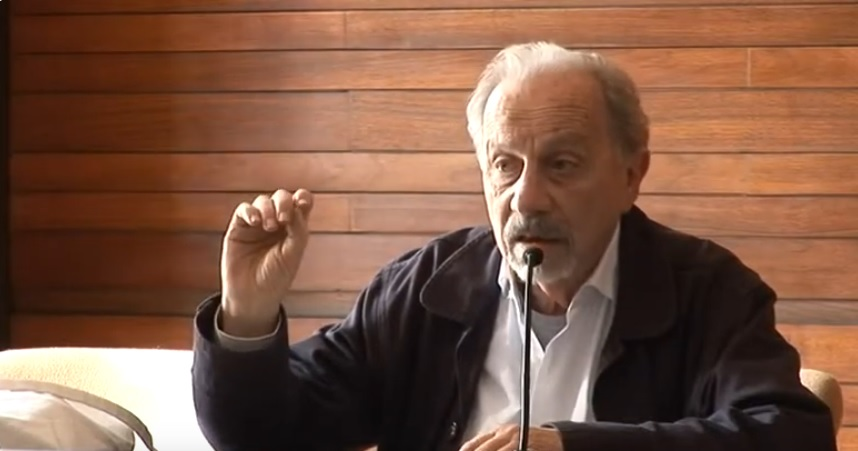
Adolfo Gilly

Adolfo Atilio Gilly Malvagni (25 August 1928 – 4 July 2023) was an Argentine-born Mexican historian and author of various books on the history of and politics of Mexico and Latin America. He served as Professor of History and Political Science at the School of Social and Political Sciences at the National Autonomous University of Mexico in Mexico City, where he taught from 1979. He was well known for his prolific articles in La Jornada, a major Mexico City newspaper. His research particularly focused on globalization and the Zapatista movement centered in the southeastern state of Chiapas.

== Biography ==
Adolfo Gilly was born on 25 August 1928. As a young man, he was part of the Argentine Socialist Party. He obtained a B.A. in Social Science and Law during his time living in Buenos Aires, and in 1994 he completed his Ph.D. in Latin America Studies with emphasis in political science at the UNAM where he taught. Gilly lived in an upper middle-class district of Coyoacán, Mexico City. He was a visiting scholar at numerous foreign universities including Yale University, UC Berkeley, Stanford University, University of Chicago, University of Maryland, and Columbia University. Some of his works have been translated into English, Japanese, Portuguese, and French. He was a full-time professor at the UNAM where he taught at the School of Graduate Studies. Dr. Gilly was Chief Advisor to the Office of Mexico City's Mayor Cuauhtémoc Cárdenas from 1997 to 2000.

Gilly died on 4 July 2023, at the age of 94.
