= Chinameca, Morelos =

Town in Morelos, Mexico

Coordinates: 18.622130°N 98.992800°W

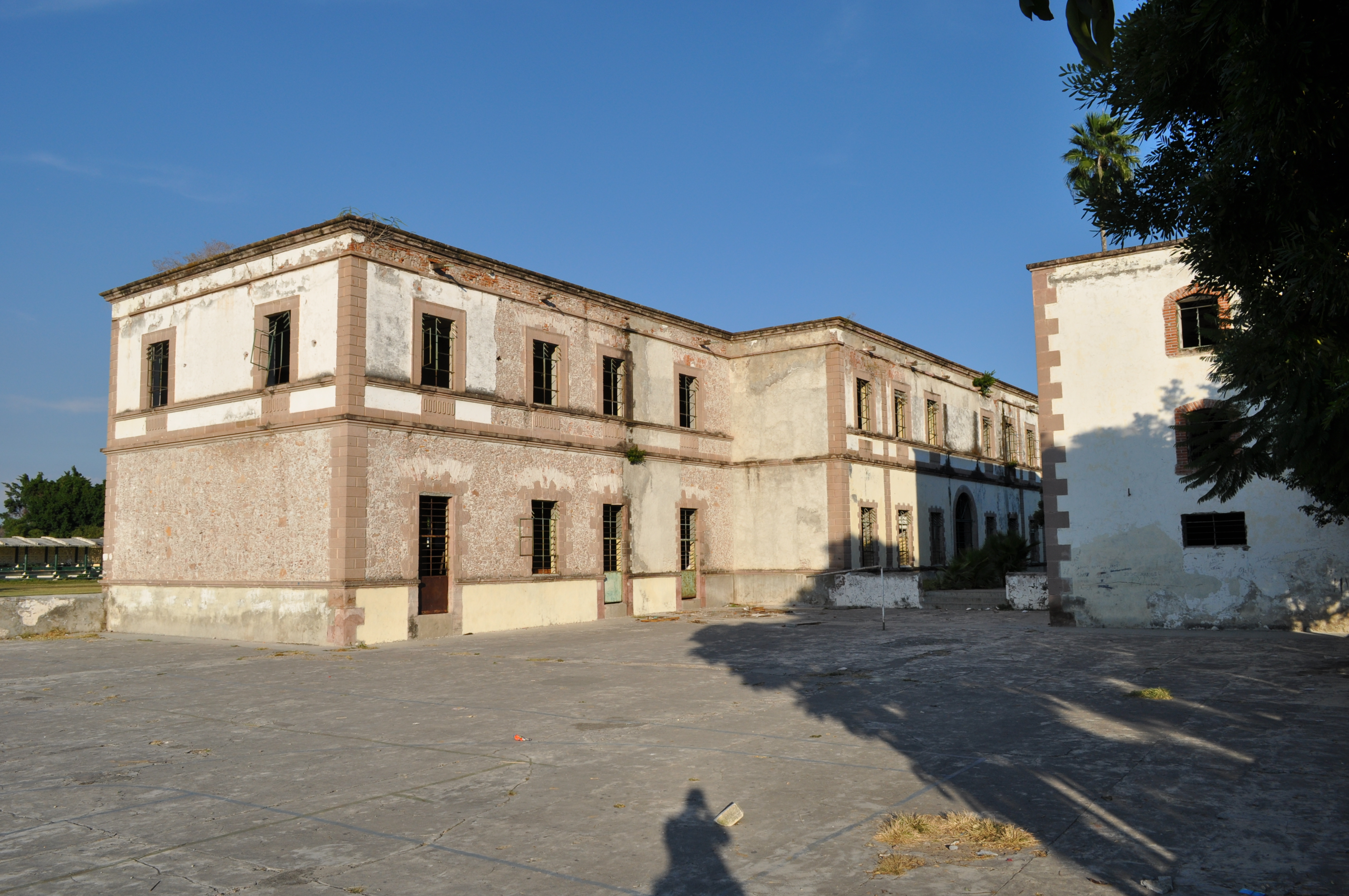
Hacienda de Chinameca

Chinameca is a location in the municipality of Ciudad Ayala and the Mexican state of Morelos. It is a farming community with a population of 2,887. Principal crops are sugar cane, corn, and beans. There is a small park with a kiosk in the center of town.

== Historical events ==
At Hacienda de Chinameca, Pablo González, a general serving Venustiano Carranza, ordered Coronel Jesús Guajardo to assassinate Mexican Revolutionist Emiliano Zapata, on April 10, 1919.

In 1700, Chinameca was a ranch owned by Felipe Cayetano Cardenas. By 1780 it was known as Rancho Nuevo. In 1899, Vicente Alonso added Rancho Nuevo to his already vast estates. By this time, the Hacienda of Chinameca consisted of 35,000 ha. The house was built by Leon Salinas in 1906 and its territory covered 64,000 ha, the largest hacienda in Morelos.

After nine years of fighting, Venustiano Carranza sent 3,000 soldiers to capture Zapata in late 1918. General Pablo Gonzalez, Carranza's man in Cuautla, sent Coronel Jesus Guajardo to do his dirty work. Guajardo offered to negotiate with Zapata and even offered him a horse called "As de Oros."

On April 10, 1919, Zapata set off on his horse from Piedra Encimada escorted by ten men. Upon entering the Hacienda of Chinameca, Zapata, his assistant Palacios, and two other bodyguards were killed.

Today there is a statue of Zapata and the Museo Nacional de Agrarismo (National Agrarian Reform Movement Museum), which opened in 2010.
