= Buenavista de Cuéllar =

City in the Mexican state of Guerrero

- Municipal seat and city
- Location in Mexico Buenavista de Cuéllar (Mexico)
- Coordinates: 18°27′N 99°26′W
- Country: Mexico
- State: Guerrero
- Municipality: Buenavista de Cuéllar

Population (2020)
  - Total: 7,233

Buenavista de Cuéllar is a city and seat of the municipality of Buenavista de Cuéllar, in the southern Mexican state of Guerrero.
