= Genovevo de la O =

Mexican politician

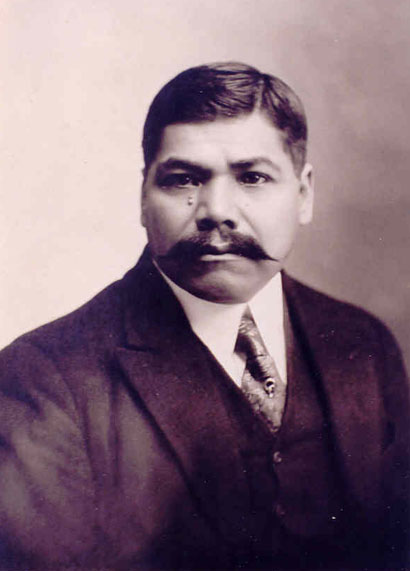
- De la O in 1913

Governor of Morelos
- In office 12 August 1914 – May 1915
- Preceded by: Pedro Ojeda
- Succeeded by: Lorenzo Vázquez

Personal details
- Born: 3 January 1876 Santa María Ahuacatitlán, Morelos, Mexico
- Died: 12 June 1952 (aged 76) Santa María Ahuacatitlán, Morelos, Mexico

Military service
- Allegiance: Liberation Army of the South, Alvaro Obregon
- Years of service: 1910–1941
- Rank: General
- Battles/wars: Mexican Revolution

Genovevo de la O (January 3, 1876 – June 12, 1952) was an important figure in the Mexican Revolution in Morelos.

He was born in Santa María Ahuacatitlán, Morelos, to sharecropper parents. He was dedicated to the plight of Mexico's peasants and came to be an outstanding Liberation Army of the South guerrilla general. After Emiliano Zapata's death, he and the other guerrillas threw their lot in with Álvaro Obregón and went on to become a minor but long-lasting figure in national politics.

== Early life ==
From his earliest days, de la O stood out as a defender of his hometown and its people. He fought ceaselessly against the encroachments of the neighboring hacienda of Temixco, against deforestation, and against land dispossession in general. These crusades brought him into conflict with the law of Porfirio Díaz's regime, which sought to strengthen the hacendados at the expense of commoners. De la O grew to hate the Díaz regime, mostly on the principle of land reform.

He initially supported the presidency of Francisco Madero based on his promises of land reform, but when those promises proved false he sided with the agrarian opposition headed by the mayor of Anenecuilco, Emiliano Zapata. De la O was one of the signatories of the reformist Plan de Ayala which codified Zapata's demands in 1911.

== Revolution under Zapata ==
The Madero government was opposed to the Plan de Ayala, and the Zapatistas took up arms to defend their cause. De la O was made an infantry captain conducting guerrilla operations for Zapata in the northern part of Morelos. He moved up through the ranks of major, lieutenant colonel, and colonel before the year was out.

Through 1911 and 1912, his division of the Liberation Army of the South operated in the area around Santa María and its neighboring towns, consistently beating back federalist forces. He forced enemy divisions to retreat to Cuernavaca, gave a solid drubbing to a group of generals led by General Robles, and inspired thousands to flock into his division.

De la O's forces took the town of Huitzilac in the Spring of 1912, but the Federalists were reluctant to give it up. General Ojeda tried to evacuate the town's supplies and equipment, but de la O exacted a heavy toll attacking the convoys. He defended the town with success, but in 1912 General Naranjo infiltrated and burned most of it to the ground.

As 1913 neared, he pushed into México state to face forces commanded by the president himself, Victoriano Huerta. De la O became a general as fighting continued along the border with México state through 1915. Huerta faded from power and Venustiano Carranza took control, bringing extra troops to bear that turned the tide back against de la O. As General Pablo González slowly pushed de la O back into Morelos, disaster befell the Zapatista cause in 1919. The leader of the revolution, Emiliano Zapata, was tricked and murdered by Colonel Jesús Guaijardo. This was a terrible blow to the Liberation Army of the South, which had already grown increasingly fractured after many long years of campaigning.

== Revolution under Obregón ==
Rather than seeing his cause and power expire along with Zapata, de la O and the other guerrilla generals, led by Gildardo Magaña, joined forces with the new revolutionary Álvaro Obregón. In 1920, he covered the retreat of General Benjamín Hill from Mexico City, and Hill too united with Obregón's forces in the south. Together they made a decisive strike at the capital city, deposed Carranza, and set up a new government.

On the first day of 1921, he was named chief of military operations in Tlaxcala, moving later to similar posts in Aguascalientes and Mexico City. Minor conflicts continued, but the Obregón regime, including de la O, remained in power in Mexico City.

== Post-Revolution politics ==
De la O held political posts until 1941 when he reached the age limit for service (sixty-five) and was forced to retire. Though officially retired, he remained involved in the affairs of Mexico. He formed Frente Zapatista in 1940 as a bastion of the ideals of Zapata. He helped found the Federation of Parties of the Mexican People in 1945, and presided over it.

He died in peace while in his hometown of Santa María Ahuacatitlán, a gentler and later death than the vast majority of his revolutionary counterparts. His wake was held on the floor of the Congress of Mexico and he was buried in Santa María with full military honors.

== See also ==
- Mexican Revolution
- Emiliano Zapata
- List of people from Morelos
