= Manuel Palafox =

Mexican politician

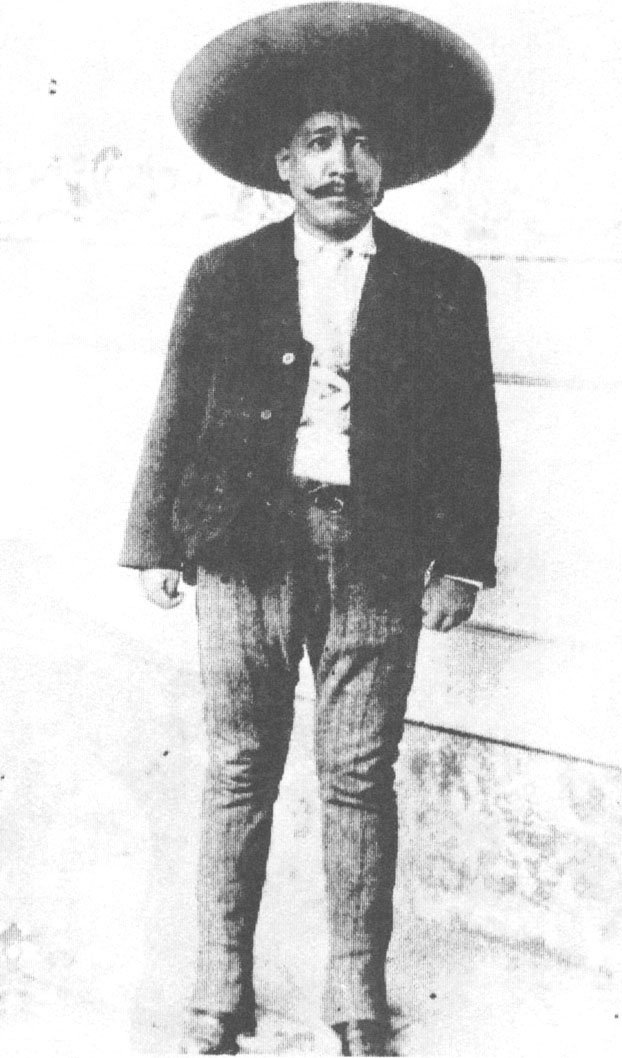
- Palafox, c. 1915
- Born: Manuel Palafox Ibarrola; 1887; Puebla, Puebla, Mexico
- Died: 25 April 1959 (aged 72); Mexico City, Mexico
- Burial place: Panteón Jardín
- Military career
- Allegiance: Liberation Army of the South, later Carranza
- Service years: 1911–1918
- Rank: General and advisor
- Conflicts: Mexican Revolution

Manuel Palafox Ibarrola (1887 – 25 April 1959), known as El Ave Negra (English: The Black Bird), was a Mexican military who participated in the Mexican Revolution with the title of general, as well as being the trusted emissary, personal secretary and one of the most close revolutionaries to Emiliano Zapata.

== Early years ==
He was born in Puebla de Zaragoza, state of Puebla, approximately in 1887, the son of Ismael Palafox and Antonia Ibarrola. He was an engineering student in his hometown and worked as a salesman and administrator for various companies in various parts of the Republic, from Oaxaca to Sinaloa. He is described as a short, thin, pockmarked man. He met Emiliano Zapata in October 1911, when he was a trusted employee at the Tenango and Santa Clara haciendas, owned by Luis García Pimentel, in whose name he made Zapata an offer.

== Mexican revolution ==
He was taken prisoner but little by little he gained Zapata's trust. In the middle of 1912 he was commissioned to speak with Emilio Vázquez Gómez who at that time was in exile in San Antonio, U.S. Upon his return, his administrative and political talents were recognized, thus consolidating his position as secretary at the headquarters and his influence over Emiliano Zapata; by 1913 he already exercised considerable control of the affairs of the movement.

== Convention ==
When the Zapatistas entered Mexico City, Palafox maneuvered to appear within the conventionist government. In December 1914 he was appointed Secretary of Agriculture and Colonization, a position he held in the cabinets of Eulalio Gutiérrez Ortiz, Roque González Garza and Francisco Lagos Cházaro and where he proposed put into practice the agrarian cause of the Zapatista movement. As of January 1915 he organized his secretariat, founded the National Rural Credit Bank, ordered the establishment of regional agricultural schools and a national factory of agricultural implements. Likewise, it created a special office for land distribution, appointed young agronomists from the National School of Agriculture to form part of the commissions in charge of demarcation and land distribution in the states of Morelos, Puebla, State of Mexico and even in Mexico City. He also confiscated all the mills and distilleries of Morelos, which worked as public companies managed by revolutionary bosses. On 28 October 1915 he promulgated the Agrarian Law, of which he was the creator.

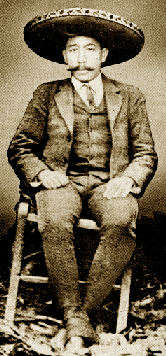
Palafox, c. 1917

In addition to being an agrarian activist, Palafox was a very active politician within Zapatismo and in its relationship with other factions. The Zapatistas nicknamed him "El Ave Negra", for his ability to intrigue. He acted in the council of war of General Luis G. Cartón, in 1914, and in that of Otilio Montaño Sánchez in 1917.

== Revolutionary decadence ==
There was a rumor among the military that Palafox was homosexual, a secret that he had managed to keep hidden and that Emiliano Zapata knew, without having any problems with it. However, since the latter was governed by the principle of executing those who were too "feminine" and seemed to have no problem with the presence of Palafox, who behaved in this way, little by little the gossip gained more strength, and finally in 1918, Zapata removed him from his position as general and main Zapatista emissary. In October of that year, he fled to the camp of General Cirilo Arenas Pérez, and in November he launched a manifesto ignoring Zapata and inviting the southerners to join an agrarian movement organized by him. To his misfortune, he did not receive an answer, since all the main chiefs remained faithful to the South Attila, with the exception of Victorino Bárcenas. On 6 August 1919, along with other generals, he launched the so-called Milpa Alta Plan. In 1920 he joined the revolutionary unification and figured in the Mexican Army, without again having an important position like the one he came to exercise.

== Death ==
On 25 April 1959, Palafox died in Mexico City aged 72. Other sources indicate that he could have been executed due to his sexual orientation, but there are no historical records to verify this version. His body was buried in Panteón Jardín, located in the same city.
