= Plan of Ayala =

Revolutionary document by Emiliano Zapata

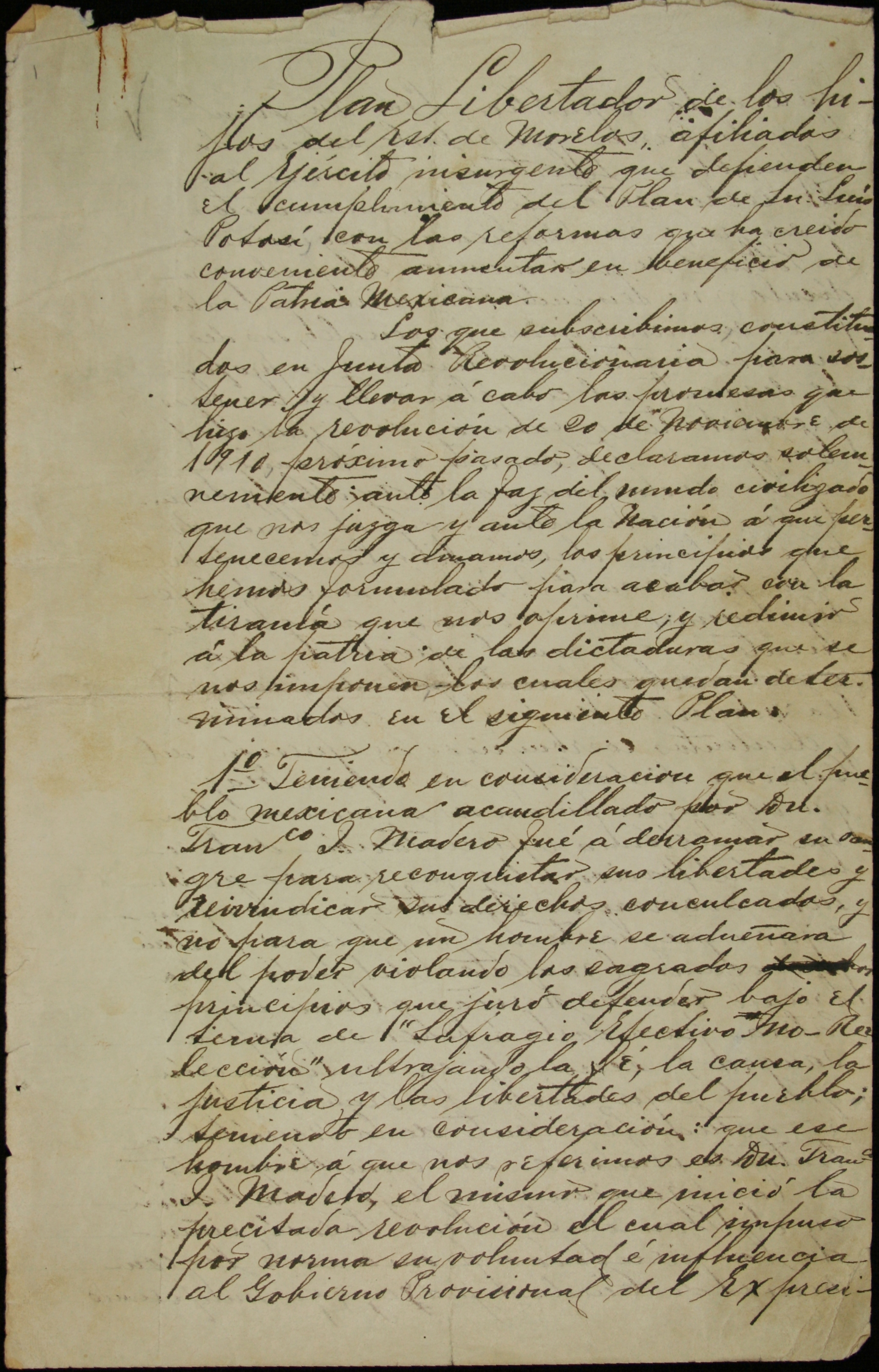
Plan of Ayala (1911), Emiliano Zapata's manuscript

Emiliano Zapata, Author of the Plan of Ayala

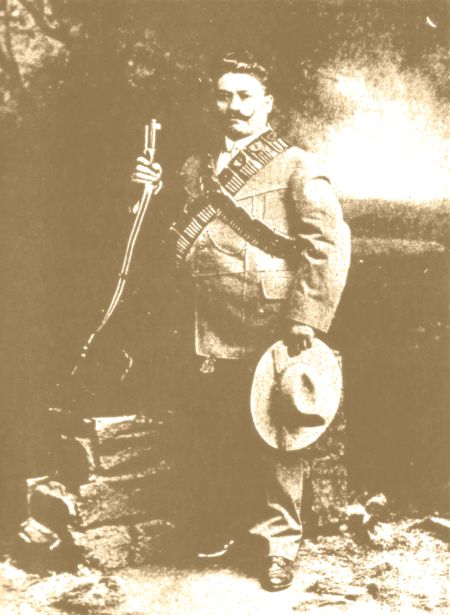
Otilio Montaño Sánchez, co-author of the Plan of Ayala

The Plan of Ayala (Spanish: Plan de Ayala) was a document drafted by revolutionary leader Emiliano Zapata during the Mexican Revolution. In it, Zapata denounced President Francisco Madero for his perceived betrayal of the revolutionary ideals embodied in Madero's Plan de San Luis Potosí, and set out his vision of land reform. The Plan was first proclaimed on November 28, 1911, in the town of Ayala, Morelos, and was later amended on June 19, 1914. The Plan of Ayala was a key document during the revolution and influenced land reform in Mexico during the 1920s and 1930s. It was the fundamental text of the Zapatistas.

== Background ==
Prior to the Revolution, much of Mexico's farmable land was owned by large landowners and not by common people. These large estates were called haciendas, whose owners would also expropriate land held by peasants and land communally owned by the native peoples. Many of these farmers had to work for the large landowners for low wages and did not own land to grow food to feed themselves or their families. One notable community was Papantla, recognized for its vanilla economy. In a letter published in El Monitor during the late 19th century, the community's struggles under Porfirio Díaz's presidency were articulated. Among the grievances highlighted were significant financial burdens, including payments for land access, exorbitant property taxes, and a monthly school tax imposed despite the absence of educational institutions outside the town.

Furthermore, the Totonac were obligated to pay for essential documents, such as birth and death certificates, and faced restrictive dress codes while in town. These challenges were exacerbated by a decline in vanilla prices, which some community members contended perpetuated their impoverishment. This confluence of grievances reflects broader systemic issues that fueled discontent and ultimately contributed to revolutionary sentiments within Papantla. This led to frustration in rural parts of Mexico. Land reform was one of the main issues that led to the Mexican Revolution. It also heavily influenced Zapata's ideas in the Plan of Ayala.

Emiliano Zapata was a revolutionary leader from the southern state of Morelos during the Mexican revolution. During the overthrow of Mexican president Porfirio Díaz he sided with Francisco Madero due to the promises made by Madero in the Plan of San Luis Potosí, especially those on land reform. On June 8, 1911, Madero met with Zapata and demanded the disarmament of Zapata's army as a precondition for discussion of agrarian reform. Zapata disagreed and Madero was later elected president on November 6. He then declared Zapata an outlaw for refusing to lay down arms. On November 28, 1911, Zapata issued the Plan of Ayala with the help of Otilio Montaño Sánchez. Sánchez worked as a school teacher in Ayala who met Zapata after working with his brother. Sánchez then co-authored the Plan of Ayala with Zapata. This occurred only three weeks after Madero became president.

== The Plan ==
The Plan was drafted with the help of local schoolteacher—and Zapata's mentor—Otilio Montaño Sánchez. It detailed Zapata's ideology and vision succinctly in the cry "Reforma, Libertad, Justicia y Ley!" ("Reform, Freedom, Justice and Law!"), later (after Zapata's death) shortened to "Tierra y Libertad!" ("Land and Freedom!", a phrase first used by Ricardo Flores Magón as the title for one of his books).

The Plan contains fifteen points, summarized here:

1. Zapata denounces Madero's revolution, claiming that his only motivation was to further his own power. Zapata also states that Madero was not carrying out the Plan of San Luis Potosí. He goes on to state that Madero is not fulfilling the promises of his revolution, is keeping much of Díaz's government intact and is suppressing the people who demand fulfillment of promises with violence. Zapata goes on to declare Madero incapable of ruling and calls on all Mexicans to continue the revolution.
2. Zapata states that Madero is no longer recognized as president and states that they are attempting to overthrow him.
3. General Pascual Orozco is nominated as Chief of the Revolution and, if he does not accept, Zapata nominates himself.
4. A declaration from the Junta of the State of Morelos that the following points are additions to the plan of San Luis Potosí, and that it makes itself the defender of the plan and its principles until victory or death.
5. The Junta of the State of Morelos will not compromise until Madero and the remainders of Díaz's government are overthrown.
6. The property taken from the people by “landlords, científicos, or bosses” will be returned to the citizens who have the titles to that property. Tribunals will be held after revolutionary victory to determine who the land belongs to; "The possession of said properties shall be kept at all costs, arms in hand. The usurpers who think they have a right to said goods may state their claims before special tribunals to be established upon the triumph of the Revolution."
7. Zapata states that the vast majority of Mexican citizens own little to no land. In addition, he states that many citizens had no way to move up in society. Due to these facts, he declares that one third of property of Mexican monopolies will be taken and redistributed to villages and individuals without land;"That to the pueblos (villages) there be given what in justice they deserve as to lands, timber, and water, which [claim] has been the origin of the present Counterrevolution"
8. In addition to the previous point, owners of monopolies that oppose this plan will lose the remaining two thirds of their properties. These properties will be used as war reparations and as payment to the victims of the struggle of the revolution, especially widows and orphans.
9. To enforce the previous two points, the current forms of nationalization laws will be used.
10. The members of Madero's revolution that supported the plan of San Luis Potosí but oppose this plan will be considered traitors and punished.
11. Expenses of war will be taken as the plan of San Luis Potosí specifies.
12. After revolutionary victory, the Junta of the revolutionary chiefs will select an interim president who will run elections afterward.
13. After revolutionary victory, the revolutionary chiefs of each state will select, in Junta, a governor for the state that will run elections to organize public powers. This is done to avoid appointment of officials, which often works against the public.
14. Zapata calls for Madero and other dictatorial parts of the government to resign, and threatens them with death if they do not.
15. Zapata calls on Mexicans to rise up against Madero, once again denouncing him and his ability to govern; "Mexicans: consider that the cunning and bad faith of one man is shedding blood in a scandalous manner, because he is incapable of governing; consider that his system of government is choking the fatherland and trampling with the brute force of bayonets on our institutions..."

On June 19, 1914, The Plan was amended after Orozco sided with Victoriano Huerta against Zapata. This removed him as Chief of Revolution and forced Zapata to take that position. The amendment ratified the original intent of the Plan and called for a continuation of the conflict until the overthrow of Victoriano Huerta —who had ordered Madero's murder—and the establishment of a government loyal to the principles of the Plan. Nothing in the rest of the Plan was altered.

== Influence and legacy ==
The Plan of Ayala helped raise support for Zapata by uniting smaller rebellions under the common banner of land reform. This was evident in increased membership to Zapata's Ejército Libertador del Sur ("Liberation Army of the South"). Zapata used the Plan to determine who he could trust during the Revolution. In 1914, the army allied with northern revolutionaries led by Venustiano Carranza and Pancho Villa to defeat Huerta and succeeded in the same year. Zapata quickly came to be in disagreement with Carranza and his Constituent Congress and took up arms once again. Zapata joined forces with Villa again to take on Carranza and Obregón because of disagreements over land reform outlined in the Plan of Ayala. Zapata mainly kept to Morelos in his battles and on April 10, 1919, was killed on Carranza's orders. His body was displayed in Cuautla to show the public that he was truly dead. After his death, the Zapatistas never regained as much influence as they had had when he was alive.

However, Zapata's successor as a leader of the Army of the South was able to strike an agreement with Carranza's successor Álvaro Obregón about an extensive agrarian reform in Morelos, in exchange for support for Obregón's revolt in 1920. Much of the reform was also carried out during Obregón's presidency - albeit only in Morelos.

Even after the Mexican Revolution, The Plan of Ayala and Zapata's ideas still influence society. In the late 20th century, the guerrilla group Ejército Zapatista de Liberación Nacional (Zapatista Army of National Liberation, EZLN) was founded in Chiapas, Mexico. EZLN's main goals are land reform and redistribution to indigenous populations. They draw many of their ideas from Zapata's ideology. The group began its rebellion after the Mexican government issued a series of economic reforms in preparation for joining the North American Free Trade Agreement, which the EZLN believed would negatively impact indigenous communities. The EZLN was originally a military group but has shifted towards more peaceful methods for change. The EZLN also use the phrase "Tierra y Libertad!" from the Plan of Ayala.

== See also ==
- Plans in Mexican history
