= Juan Salgado Brito =

Mexican politician (1948–2025)

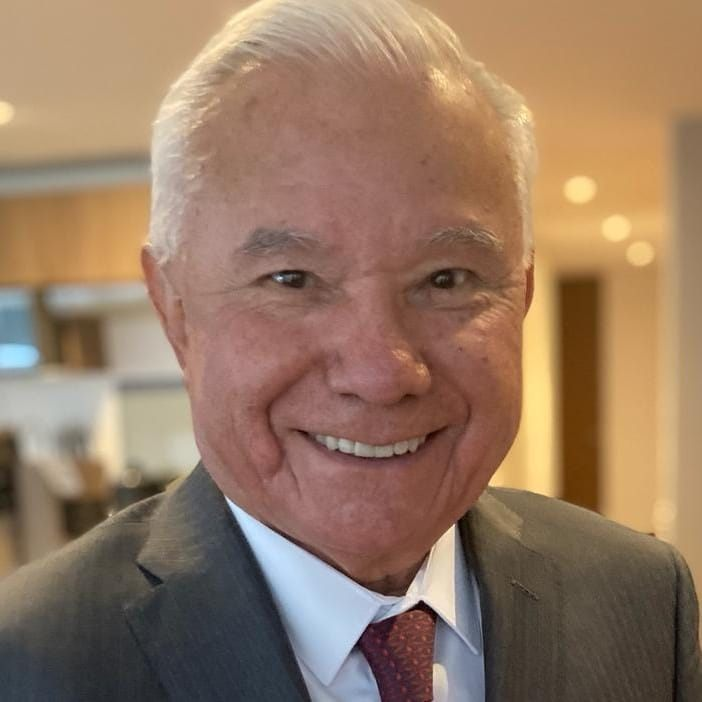
- Salgado Brito in 2022

Secretary of Government of Morelos
- In office 2024–2025
- Governor: Margarita González Saravia

Personal details
- Born: 29 February 1948 Tlaltizapán, Morelos, Mexico
- Died: 27 October 2025 (aged 77)
- Party: Morena (from 2014); PRI (until 2006)
- Education: UAEM, UNAM

Juan Salgado Brito (Note: In this Spanish name, the first or paternal surname is Salgado and the second or maternal family name is Brito.) (29 February 1948 – 27 October 2025) was a Mexican politician. Long affiliated with the Institutional Revolutionary Party (PRI), he joined the National Regeneration Movement (Morena) upon its creation in the early 2010s.

He served in both the state congress of his native Morelos and the Congress of the Union, and he was also elected to a term as municipal president of Cuernavaca. He contended for the governorship of Morelos for the PRI in 2000 but lost to Sergio Estrada Cajigal of the opposition National Action Party. At the time of his death, he was a member of Governor Margarita González Saravia's cabinet.

== Political career ==
Salgado Brito was born in Tlaltizapán, Morelos, on 29 February 1948. He earned a law degree from the Autonomous University of Morelos (UAEM), followed by a master's and a doctorate from the National Autonomous University of Mexico (UNAM).

Representing the PRI, he served two terms in the Congress of Morelos (1973–1976 and 2003–2006) and two terms in the federal Chamber of Deputies: 1982–1985, for Morelos's 1st district, and 1994–1997, for Morelos's 3rd.

In 1985–1988, he served as municipal president of Cuernavaca, Morelos. At the start of his time in office as mayor, he had to deal with reconstruction following the 19 September 1985 earthquake. He also launched the Cuernavaca Flower Festival, built three public markets in the municipality, and undertook construction of a cultural centre in Teopanzolco opposite the archaeological site.

He ran for governor of Morelos in 2000 on the PRI ticket, but lost to Sergio Estrada Cajigal of the National Action Party (PAN), who became the state's first governor from an opposition party since the position was re-established in the aftermath of the 1910 Revolution.

Salgado acted as Andrés Manuel López Obrador's campaign coordinator in Morelos during his unsuccessful 2006 presidential bid and, in the 2010s, he was a founding member of López Obrador's National Regeneration Movement (Morena). He sought the party's nomination for the governorship of Morelos in the 2024 election, but lost to Margarita González Saravia.

Salgado Brito died on 27 October 2025, at the age of 77, while in office as secretary of government of Morelos under Governor González Saravia. He was replaced by his under-secretary, Miguel Ángel Peláez Gerardo.

== Personal life ==
At the time of his death, Salgado Brito was married to Laura Weiler Sierra. One of his children, Magda Salgado Ponce, was elected to a plurinominal seat in the Chamber of Deputies in the 2024 general election, representing Morena, and another, Juan Carlos Salgado Ponce, was appointed as Morelos's secretary of economic development in 2015 under Governor Graco Ramírez.
