= Raymundo Riva Palacio =

Mexican journalist (1954)

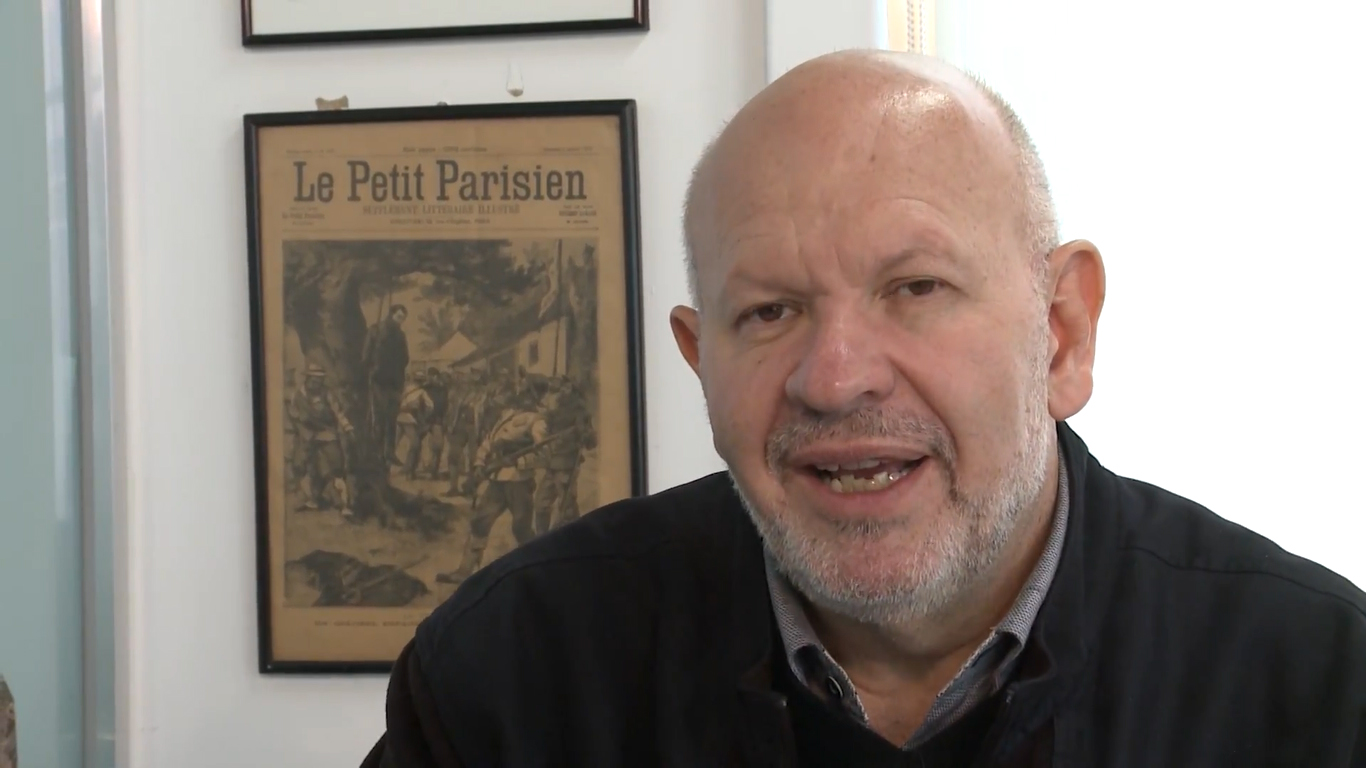
Raymundo Riva Palacio in 2018

Raymundo Riva Palacio Neri (Note: In this Spanish name, the first or paternal surname is Riva Palacio and the second or maternal family name is Neri.) (born 1954) is a Mexican journalist and television presenter.

Riva Palacio was born in Mexico City in 1954 into a prominent political family that included the 19th-century figures Mariano and Vicente Riva Palacio. His father was Emilio Riva Palacio Morales, who served as governor of Morelos from 1964 to 1970.

He studied journalism at the Carlos Septién García School of Journalism (EPCSG) in Mexico City. In 1985 and 2007 he was awarded Mexico's National Journalism Prize.
