= Riva Palacio =

Riva Palacio may refer to:

- Riva Palacio, a municipality in the Mexican state of Chihuahua
- Riva Palacio, the largest Mennonite colony in Bolivia, see Mennonites in Bolivia
- ARM Riva Palacio, a minesweeper of the Mexican Navy

== People with the surname ==
- Mariano Riva Palacio (1803–1880), Mexican politician and lawyer, three times governor of the State of México
- Vicente Riva Palacio (1832–1896), Mexican politician, essayist, novelist and historian
- Carlos Riva Palacio (1892–1936), Mexican politician, president of the Partido Nacional Revolucionario in 1933–1934
- Emilio Riva Palacio Morales (1910–1985), Mexican politician, governor of Morelos from 1964 to 1970
- Antonio Riva Palacio López (1926–2014), Mexican politician, governor of Morelos from 1988 to 1994
- Enrique Riva Palacio Galicia (born 1944), Mexican engineer and politician, represented the 23rd federal electoral district of the State of Mexico
- Raymundo Riva Palacio (born 1954), Mexican journalist
