= Antonio Riva Palacio =

Mexican politician (1926–2014)

Ambassador of Mexico in Ecuador
- In office 1994–1998

Governor of Morelos
- In office 18 May 1988 – 17 May 1994
- Preceded by: Lauro Ortega Martínez
- Succeeded by: Jorge Carrillo Olea

Senator for Morelos
- In office 1982–1987

Federal deputy for Morelos's 1st
- In office 1 September 1976 – 31 August 1979
- Preceded by: José Castillo Pombo
- Succeeded by: David Jiménez González

Personal details
- Born: 26 April 1926 Cuautla, Morelos, Mexico
- Died: 15 July 2014 (aged 88) Cuernavaca, Morelos, Mexico
- Party: PRI
- Education: UNAM
- Profession: Lawyer

Antonio Riva Palacio López (Note: In this Spanish name, the first or paternal surname is Riva Palacio and the second or maternal family name is López.) (26 April 1926 – 15 July 2014) was a Mexican lawyer, politician, and member of the Institutional Revolutionary Party (PRI). After representing his party in both chambers of Congress, he served as the governor of Morelos for a full six-year term – the last PRI governor to do so – from 1988 to 1994.

== Biography ==
Antonio Riva Palacio was born in Cuautla, Morelos, on 26 April 1926, into a prominent political family that included the 19th-century figures Mariano and Vicente Riva Palacio. He earned a law degree from the National Autonomous University of Mexico (UNAM) in 1951 and later taught law at the Autonomous University of Morelos (UAEM).

He joined the PRI in 1946. In the 1976 general election, he was elected to the Chamber of Deputies to represent Morelos's 1st district during the 50th Congress and, in the 1982 general election, he was elected to the Senate for the state of Morelos. During his legislative terms, he served as the president of both chambers.

In 1988 he fought and won the Morelos gubernatorial election. He served as governor from 18 May 1988 to 17 May 1994, making him the last governor from the PRI, as of 2025, to serve a full term.

On 5 August 1993, he and his attorney general, Tomás Flores Allende, were nearly lynched in Jonacatepec after the police attacked several of the townspeople. The citizens were repressed by Grupo Scorpion under the command of Colonel Jorge Encinas Gutiérrez. None of the accusations went to trial. After leaving the governor's office, Riva Palacio was accused of leaving the state deep in debt while personally becoming wealthy. He was alleged to have committed hundreds of cases of abuse of power, nepotism, and other crimes, including homicide.

He was appointed Mexico's ambassador to Ecuador in 1994, where he remained until 1998.

Antonio Riva Palacio López died in Cuernavaca, Morelos, on 15 July 2014, at the age of 88.

== See also ==
- List of people from Morelos
