= La Orquesta =

Mexican newspaper (1861–1877)

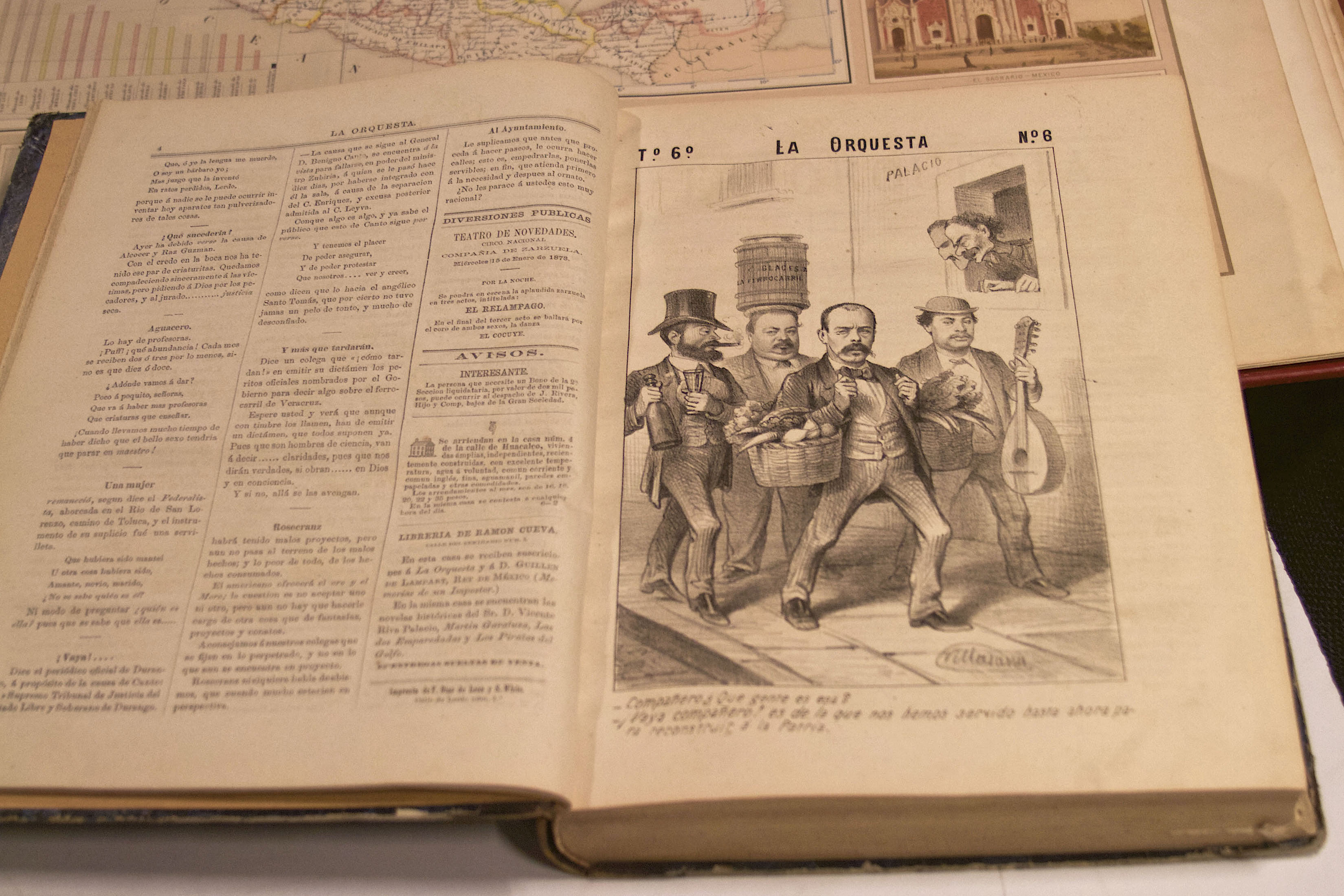
Pages of La Orquesta, with a caricature by José María Villasana

La Orquesta was a Mexican newspaper published biweekly in Mexico City from 1861 to 1877. It gained a reputation for its caricatures, creating a "lively, animated, and personal" genre.

== History ==
Its direct predecessor, Mi Sombrero, was created in 1860 by Carlos R. Casarín, who collaborated with Luis Ponce and Constantino Escalante, Casarín's cousin. Both edited the short-lived Mi Sombrero. In March 1861, La Orquesta was founded by Casarín—who utilized the pseudonym "el ciudadano Roberto Macario"—and Escalante. It was edited by Manuel C. de Villegas, and published by the Imprenta de la Paz del Callejón de las Cazuelas in Mexico City. The three, along with painter Hesiquio Iriarte, were the owners. The publication sold every Wednesday and Saturday, and was the first Mexican newspaper to outlast its foundation year.

During the Second French intervention in Mexico it suffered multiple periods of inactivity. One such instance was in 1866, when it was briefly substituted by El Impolítico under the direction of José María Casasola; El Impolítico was published five times. In June 1867, La Orquesta resumed publication under Vicente Riva Palacio, who utilized the pseudonym "Juan de Jarras", a character from his first novel, Calvario y tabor.

In September 1877, it ceased publication.

== Staff and collaborators ==
From 1861 to 1872, it had about 17 editors-in-chief. Some included Casarín, Escalante, Hilarión Frías y Soto, Riva Palacio, and José R. Pérez. Cesarín was the founding editor and remained in the position for under a year. Escalante succeeded him, serving from late 1861 to early 1862. Then Frías succeeded him.

Columnists included Antonio Carrión, Juan N. Berra, Ignacio Gazaluz, Juan Darío de Sais, Lorenzo Elízaga, Luis Gonzaga Iza, José R. Pérez (possible pseudonym of Ignacio Ramírez), Vicente Riva Palacio, Francisco Pimentel, Juan Antonio Mateos, Juan de Dios Arias, and Frías y Soto, among others; and cartoonists Escalante, who used the pseudonym "Tolín", Santiago Hernández, José María Villasana, and José Tiburcio Alamilla. Literary and poetic figures published included José Puig Caracena, José María de Salas y Quiroga, José M. Esteva (who dedicated a sonnet to Juan Díaz Covarrubias), José Selgas y Carrasco, Anselmo de la Portilla, Guillermo Prieto, Francisco Zarco, and Florencio María del Castillo, among many others.

== Editorial Line ==
La Orquesta sought to revindicate liberal principles and the freedom of press, in a moment where the Congress of the Union affected press laws and suspended individual guarantees. Its principal objective was to mock the governmental decisions of Benito Juárez and his ministers, particularly Sebastián Lerdo de Tejada. Commonly criticized were the financial administration, bankruptcy from poor implementation of the Reform Laws, the Second French intervention, and the Second Mexican Empire of Maximilian.

The attacks against Juárez's administration was scathing in its editorials, like in its caricatures, which employed the physical deformation of people through the era's archetypes. Animalization of physical traits was predominantly used by Escalante, Hernández, and Casarín to ridicule the political class. For example, cats referred to the entanglements of politicians, crabs regression to the conservative regime, and flies waste and foul odor. Escalante initiated the use of caricatures and in 1872 he was succeeded by Hernández as head of their production.
