= Juan Pablo Adame =

Mexican politician (1985–2023)

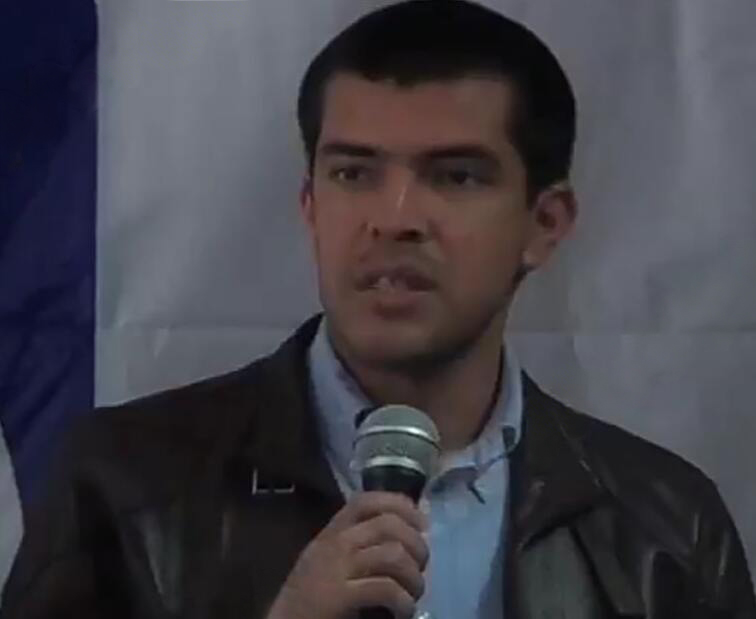
- Adame in 2017
- Born: 12 September 1985; Cuernavaca, Morelos, Mexico
- Died: 5 December 2023 (aged 38)
- Occupation: Deputy
- Political party: PAN
- Website: https://web.archive.org/web/20131104203814/http://juanpabloadame.mx/

Juan Pablo Adame Alemán (12 September 1985 – 5 December 2023) was a Mexican politician affiliated with the PAN. He served as Deputy of the LXII Legislature of the Mexican Congress (2012–2015) representing Morelos. He was the son of Marco Antonio Adame, who served as governor of Morelos for 2006 to 2012.

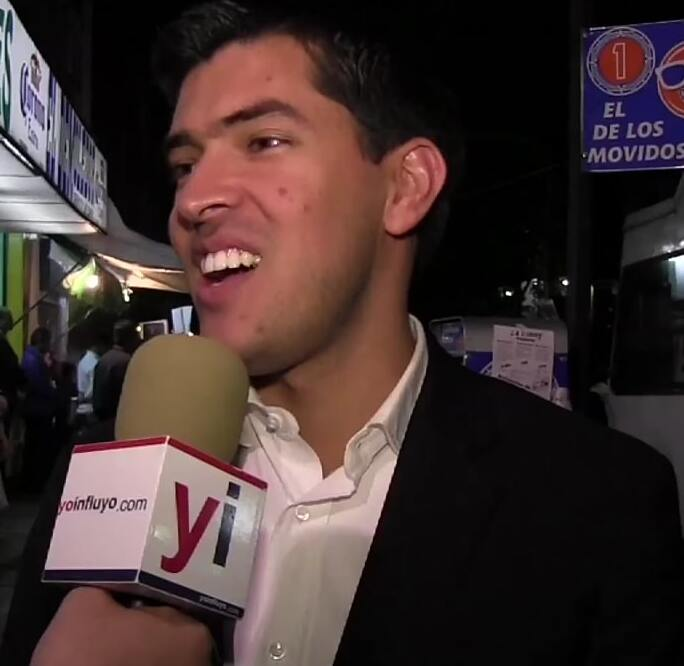
Adame in 2014

Juan Pablo Adame died on 5 December 2023, at the age of 38, from stomach cancer.

== See also ==
- List of people from Morelos
