= Francisco Moreno Merino =

Mexican lawyer and politician

- Born: 11 August 1966 (age 60); Morelos, Mexico
- Education: National Autonomous University of Mexico
- Occupations: Lawyer and politician
- Political party: PRI

Francisco Alejandro Moreno Merino (born 11 August 1966) is a Mexican lawyer and politician from the Institutional Revolutionary Party. From 2009 to 2012 he served as a federal deputy in the 61st Congress, representing the first district of Morelos.
