= 1st federal electoral district of Morelos =

Federal electoral district of Mexico

Morelos's 1st
- Electoral district of the Chamber of Deputies of Mexico

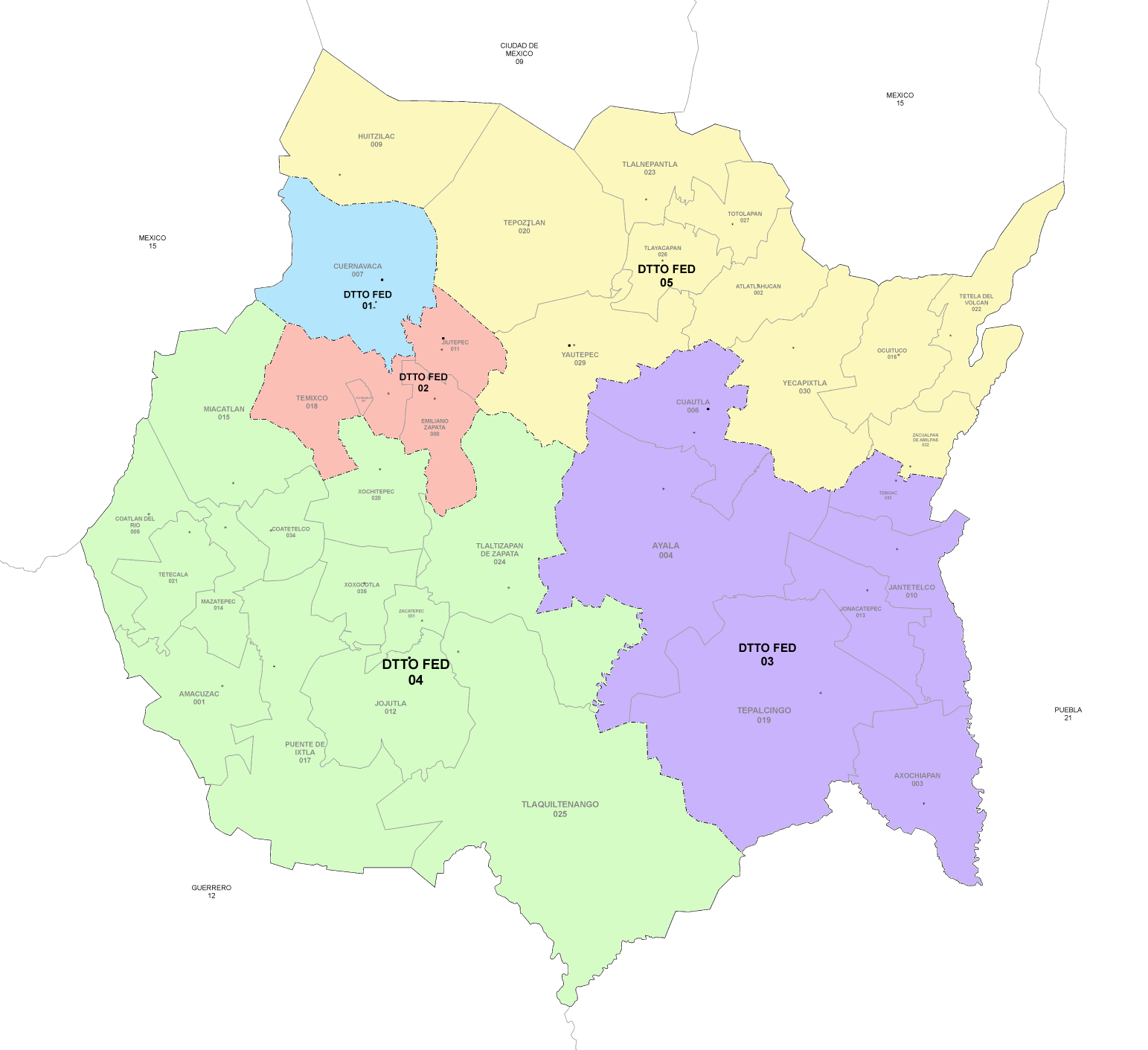
- 1st district

Incumbent
- Member: Sandra Anaya Villegas
- Party: ▌Morena
- Congress: 66th (2024–2027)

District
- State: Morelos
- Head town: Cuernavaca
- Coordinates: 18°55′N 99°14′W
- Covers: Municipality of Cuernavaca (bulk)
- PR region: Fourth
- Precincts: 205
- Population: 376,292 (2020 census)

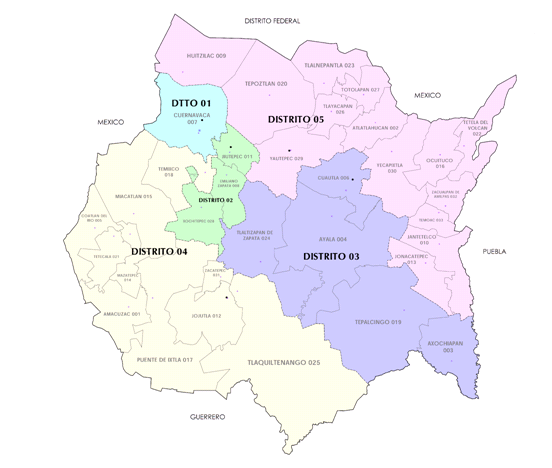
Morelos under the 2017–2022 districting plan

The 1st federal electoral district of Morelos (Spanish: Distrito electoral federal 01 de Morelos) is one of the 300 electoral districts into which Mexico is divided for elections to the federal Chamber of Deputies and one of five such districts in the state of Morelos.

It elects one deputy to the lower house of Congress for each three-year legislative period by means of the first-past-the-post system. Votes cast in the district also count towards the calculation of proportional representation ("plurinominal") deputies elected from the fourth region.

The current member for the district, elected in the 2024 general election, is Sandra Anaya Villegas of the National Regeneration Movement (Morena).

== District territory ==
Under the 2023 districting plan adopted by the National Electoral Institute (INE), which is to be used for the 2024, 2027 and 2030 federal elections, the 1st district covers the 205 precincts (secciones electorales) that make up the main part of the municipality of Cuernavaca in the north-west of the state. (Note: Not included is the exclave of the municipality known as la Isla that is surrounded by Temixco. The exclave is assigned to the 2nd district.)

The head town (cabecera distrital), where results from individual polling stations are gathered together and tallied, is the state capital, the city of Cuernavaca. The district reported a population of 376,292 in the 2020 census.

== Previous districting schemes ==
Evolution of electoral district numbers
	1974	1978	1996	2005	2017	2023
Morelos	2	4	4	5	5	5
Chamber of Deputies	196	300				

2017–2022

Under the scheme in force from 2017 to 2022, the 1st district comprised 203 of the 205 precincts in the municipality of Cuernavaca, with the remaining two (in the exclave) assigned to the 2nd district.

2005–2017

Under the 2005 plan, which gave Morelos its fifth congressional seat, the district covered 203 of the 205 precincts in the municipality of Cuernavaca, with the remaining two (in the exclave) assigned to the 2nd district.

1996–2005

In the 1996 scheme, the district comprised the municipalities of Cuernavaca and Huitzilac, with Cuernavaca serving as the head town.

1978–1996

The districting scheme in force from 1978 to 1996 was the result of the 1977 electoral reforms, which increased the number of single-member seats in the Chamber of Deputies from 196 to 300. Under that plan, Morelos's seat allocation rose from two to four. The 1st district covered the municipality of Cuernavaca.

== Deputies returned to Congress ==
(Mexico) National parties
- Current
- PAN
- PRI
- PT
- PVEM
- MC
- Morena
- PAZ
- Somos
- Defunct or local only
- PLM
- PNR
- PRM
- PNM
- PP
- PPS
- PARM
- PFCRN
- CON
- PANAL
- PSD
- PES
- PES
- PRD

Morelos's 1st district
Election	Deputy	Party	Term	Legislature
1916	Antonio Garza Zambrano		1916–1917	Constituent Congress of Querétaro
...
1955	Federico Sánchez Navarrete	National Action Party (Mexico)	1955–1958	43rd Congress
...
1973	José Castillo Pombo	Institutional Revolutionary Party	1973–1976	49th Congress
1976	Antonio Riva Palacio López	Institutional Revolutionary Party	1976–1979	50th Congress
1979	David Jiménez González	Institutional Revolutionary Party	1979–1982	51st Congress
1982	Juan Salgado Brito	Institutional Revolutionary Party	1982–1985	52nd Congress
1985	David Jiménez González	Institutional Revolutionary Party	1985–1988	53rd Congress
1988	Mario Rojas Alba	Popular Socialist Party (Mexico)	1988–1991	54th Congress
1991	Rodolfo Becerril Straffon	Institutional Revolutionary Party	1991–1994	55th Congress
1994	Jorge Armando Meade Ocaranza	Institutional Revolutionary Party	1994–1997	56th Congress
1997	Alfonso Sandoval Camuñas (Note: Sandoval Camuñas died in office on 23 January 1998.); Juan Jaramillo Fricas	Institutional Revolutionary Party	1997–1998; 1998–2000	57th Congress
2000	Fernando Martínez Cué	National Action Party (Mexico)	2000–2003	58th Congress
2003	José Sigona Torres	National Action Party (Mexico)	2003–2006	59th Congress
2006	Enrique Iragorri Durán	National Action Party (Mexico)	2006–2009	60th Congress
2009	Francisco Moreno Merino	Institutional Revolutionary Party	2009–2012	61st Congress
2012	José Francisco Coronato Rodríguez	Citizens' Movement (Mexico)	2012–2015	62nd Congress
2015	Javier Bolaños Aguilar	National Action Party (Mexico)	2015–2018	63rd Congress
2018	Alejandro Mojica Toledo	National Regeneration Movement	2018–2021	64th Congress
2021	Jorge Alberto Barrera Toledo	National Regeneration Movement	2021–2024	65th Congress
2024	Sandra Anaya Villegas	National Regeneration Movement	2024–2027	66th Congress

== Presidential elections ==
Morelos's 1st district
Election	District won by	Party or coalition	%
2018	Andrés Manuel López Obrador	Juntos Haremos Historia	57.0404
2024	Claudia Sheinbaum Pardo	Sigamos Haciendo Historia	49.7610
