= USS Jubilant =

Admirable-class minesweeper built for the United States Navy

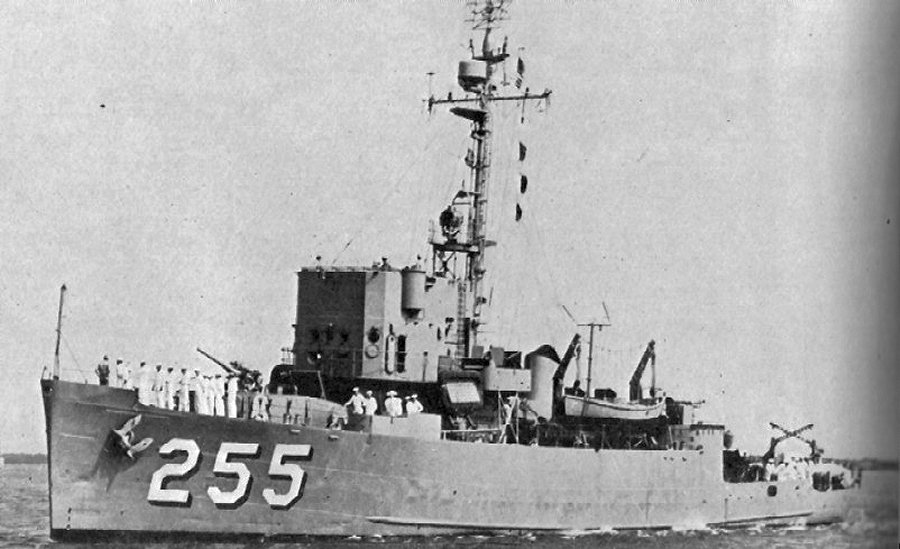

History

United States
- Name: USS Jubilant (AM-255)
- Builder: American Ship Building Company, Lorain, Ohio
- Laid down: 22 October 1942
- Launched: 20 February 1943
- Sponsored by: Mrs. C. D. Bishop
- Commissioned: 27 August 1943
- Decommissioned: 18 May 1946
- Recommissioned: 11 May 1951
- Decommissioned: 27 April 1954
- Reclassified: MSF-255, 7 February 1955
- Stricken: 1 May 1962
- Fate: Transferred to Mexican Navy, 1 October 1962

History

Mexico
- Name: ARM DM-01
- Acquired: 1 October 1962
- Renamed: ARM General Vicente Riva Palacio (C50), 1994
- Namesake: Miguel Negrete
- Stricken: 2000
- Fate: Sunk as artificial reef, August 2001

General characteristics
- Class & type: Admirable-class minesweeper
- Displacement: 650 long tons (660 t)
- Length: 184 ft 6 in (56.24 m)
- Beam: 33 ft (10 m)
- Draft: 9 ft 9 in (2.97 m)
- Propulsion: 2 × ALCO 539 diesel engines, 1,710 shp (1,280 kW); Farrel-Birmingham single reduction gear; 2 shafts
- Speed: 15 knots (28 km/h)
- Complement: 104
- Armament: 1 × 3"/50 caliber (76 mm) DP gun; 2 × twin Bofors 40 mm guns; 1 × Hedgehog anti-submarine mortar; 2 × Depth charge tracks

Service record
- Part of: U.S. Atlantic Fleet (1943–1946, 1951–1954); Atlantic Reserve Fleet (1946–1951, 1954–1962); Mexican Navy (1962-2000)

USS Jubilant (AM-255) was an Admirable-class minesweeper built for the United States Navy during World War II. She served in the Atlantic during World War II. She was decommissioned in May 1946 and placed in reserve. Although she did not see service in the war zone, Jubilant was recommissioned in May 1951 during the Korean War and remained in commission until April 1954, when she was placed in reserve again. While she remained in reserve, Jubilant was reclassified as MSF-255 in February 1955 but never reactivated. In October 1962, she was sold to the Mexican Navy and renamed ARM DM-01. In 1994 she was renamed ARM General Miguel Negrete (C50). She was stricken in 2000, and sunk as an artificial reef off Veracruz in August 2001.

== U.S. Navy career ==
Jubilant was launched 20 February 1943 by American Shipbuilding Co., Lorain, Ohio; sponsored by Mrs. C. D. Bishop; and commissioned 27 August. Jubilant departed Lorain 13 September and steamed via Quebec and Argentia, Newfoundland for Little Creek, Virginia. While sailing along the Atlantic coast, she made a submarine contact, 23 October and launched a depth charge and hedgehog attack which resulted in a probable hit. Arriving Little Creek the 23d, she commenced 4 months of minesweeping and escort training, then departed 1 March 1944 for convoy escort duty in the South Atlantic.

She arrived Trinidad, British West Indies, 12 March and departed the next day as escort for a convoy bound for Recife, Brazil. Arriving 26 March, she proceeded to Rio de Janeiro and Bahia, Brazil before returning to Trinidad 30 May Jubilant made several escort voyages between Trinidad and Brazilian ports and engaged in coastal minesweeping operations before departing Trinidad 23 March 1945 for the United States.

Reaching Norfolk, Virginia, 29 March she conducted minesweeping operations in the Chesapeake Bay until departing 30 April for convoy duty along the eastern seaboard. On 17 May she returned to Norfolk and resumed minesweeping operations. Serving as a minesweeping training ship, she continued her duty out of Norfolk until 4 March 1946; then she departed for Orange, Texas. Arriving 11 March, Jubilant decommissioned 18 May and joined the Atlantic Reserve Fleet.

In order to bolster the fleet during the Korean War, Jubilant recommissioned 11 May 1951. Departing 24 May, she steamed to Charleston, South Carolina, to join Mine Squadron 8, Atlantic Fleet, 29 May For more than 2 years Jubilant operated out of Charleston along the Atlantic coast up to the Chesapeake Bay.

She cleared Charleston 19 February 1954 and returned to Orange the 28th. Jubilant decommissioned 27 April and entered the Atlantic Reserve Fleet. She was redesignated MSF-255 on 7 February 1955. Subsequently, Jubilant was stricken from the Navy List 1 May 1962 and sold to Mexico on 1 October 1962.

== Mexican Navy career ==
The former Jubilant was acquired by the Mexican Navy on 1 October 1962 and renamed ARM DM-01. In 1994, she was renamed ARM Riva Palacio (C50) after General Vicente Riva Palacio. She was stricken in 2000, and sunk as an artificial reef off the Anegada Reef and Isla Verde in Veracruz in August 2001 in 28 meters depth of water, and is a recreational dive site.
