= Sergio Estrada Cajigal =

Mexican politician

Sergio Alberto Estrada Cajigal Ramírez
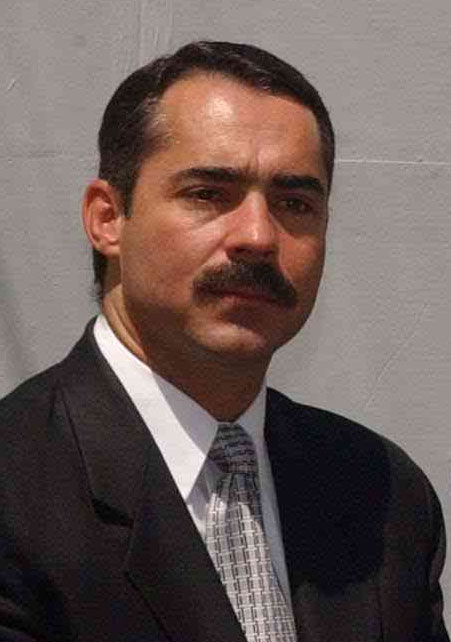

Governor of Morelos
- In office October 1, 2000 – October 1, 2006
- Preceded by: Jorge Arturo García Rubí
- Succeeded by: Marco Antonio Adame

Personal details
- Born: August 23, 1961 (age 65) Cuernavaca, Morelos
- Party: National Action Party
- Spouse: María del Carmen Borbolla
- Profession: Communication science

Sergio Alberto Estrada Cajigal Ramírez (Note: In this Spanish name, the first or paternal surname is Estrada Cajigal and the second or maternal family name is Ramírez.) (born August 23, 1961) is a Mexican politician. Born in Cuernavaca, Morelos, he was the governor of the state of Morelos for the National Action Party (PAN) from 2000 to 2006, and who served two periods as mayor of Cuernavaca. His grandfather Vicente Estrada Cajigal was the governor of Morelos from 1930-1935. In 2009 he left the PAN and in 2012 he supported the candidate for Governorship of PRI. Since leaving the governorship he has been embroiled in some highly publicized legal and political controversies, but has not been indicted for any wrong-doings.

== Mayor of Cuernavaca ==
Sergio Estrada Cajigal was the first opposition-party Presidente Municipal (municipal president or mayor) elected in Cuernavaca's history (1997-2000). He solved a waste collection crisis by privatizing the service, and his administration was known for numerous public works projects, such as street paving and the construction of a bridge on the north side of the city.

== Governor of Morelos ==
Estrada Cajigal was the first opposition governor of the state of Morelos (2000-2006).

A licensed helicopter pilot, Estrada Cajigal became embroiled in controversy when he rented a helicopter for use by the state, supposedly to improve police and emergency functions. The governor was often seen flying the helicopter, accompanied by female friends; the press soon dubbed it the Helicóptero del Amor ("Helicopter of Love").

As governor, Estrada Cajigal was accused of having links to drug cartels and a car-theft ring, as well as misuse of funds, although he denied such links and no charges were ever filed.

Due to changing markets, Estrada Cajigal supported the shift of the state's agricultural base away from sugarcane production to that of ornamental flowers for exportation. The governor was accused of supporting expropriation of communal farmlands in favor of large businesses and as ex-governor, for personal gain in the Ejido of Acapantzingo. He says the land "was gifted" (fue regalado) by Eduardo Moreno Ramos, son of a local landowner.

The administration of Estrada Cagijal was also known for its inexperience and political repression, particularly in the municipality of Tlalnepantla and when ecologists opposed the conversion of the former hotel Casino de la Selva into a retail property. Juliana Quintanilla, of the Comisión Independiente de Derechos Humanos de Morelos ("Independent Human Rights Commission of Morelos") accused his administration of more than 10 violent evictions and more than 1,500 complaints of human rights abuses. On the other hand, Jorge Messeguer claims that Estrada has looked the other way at organized crime in Huitzilac, where illegal logging, car theft, drug trafficking, and kidnapping are common.

== Later political career ==
In the 2024 general election he contended for Morelos's 1st congressional district despite having been arrested for domestic violence in Cancún, Quintana Roo, on 24 May. However, he lost the 2 June election to Sandra Anaya Villegas of the National Regeneration Movement (Morena).

== Dispute with sons ==
In an article in La Jornada published December 26, 2019, Sergio Estrada Cajigal Barrera claimed that his two sons, Vicente and Sergio Estrada Cajigal Ramirez, had falsified documents, leaving him penniless.

== See also ==
- List of people from Morelos

Preceded by Jorge Arturo García Rubí	Governor of Morelos; 2006–2012	Succeeded by Marco Antonio Adame
