= Jorge Arturo García Rubí =

Mexican politician (1948–2023)

Governor of Morelos
- In office 18 May 2000 – 30 September 2000
- Preceded by: Jorge Morales Barud
- Succeeded by: Sergio Estrada Cajigal

Personal details
- Born: 21 November 1948; Cuernavaca, Morelos, Mexico
- Died: 31 October 2023 (aged 74); Morelos, Mexico
- Political party: Institutional Revolutionary Party

Jorge Arturo García Rubí (21 November 1948 – 31 October 2023) was a Mexican lawyer, politician, and member of the Institutional Revolutionary Party (PRI). García held prominent legal and political offices in the Mexican state of Morelos, including Attorney General of Morelos from 1993 to 1993 and interim Governor of Morelos from May 2000 until September 2000.

In 2023, García, who suffered from health issues, underwent brain surgery at XXI Century National Medical Center in Mexico City. He was transferred to a hospital in Morelos state, where he died on 31 October 2023, at the age of 75.
