= Enrique Iragorri Durán =

Mexican politician from Morelos

- Born: 1 November 1969 (age 56); Cuernavaca, Morelos, Mexico
- Occupation: Politician
- Political party: PAN

Enrique Iragorri Durán (born 1 November 1969) is a Mexican politician affiliated with the National Action Party (PAN). In 2006–2009 he served as a federal deputy in the 60th Congress, representing the first district of Morelos.
