= José Sigona Torres =

Mexican businessman and politician

- Born: 18 June 1953 (age 73); State of Mexico, Mexico
- Education: UNAM; University of Valencia
- Occupations: Businessman and politician
- Political party: PAN

José Sigona Torres (born 18 June 1953) is a businessman and former politician. He is the CEO of Grupo Empresarial Sigona. He founded, 40 years ago, and retains charge of Transmisiones y Equipos Industriales, S.A. de C.V. (TEISA), one of the biggest pump and power distributors in Mexico City and seven major cities in the country.

Torres served as a federal deputy during the 59th session of the Congress of Mexico, representing the 1st district of Morelos for the National Action Party (PAN), from August 2003 to August 2006.
