= José Francisco Coronato Rodríguez =

Mexican politician and lawyer

- Born: 4 December 1953 (age 72); Cuernavaca, Morelos, Mexico
- Died: Since 2020
- Education: Doctor?
- Occupation: Deputy
- Political party: MC

José Francisco Coronato Rodríguez (born 4 December 1953) is a Mexican politician and lawyer affiliated with the Citizens' Movement (MC). In 2012–2015 he served as a federal deputy in the 62nd Congress, representing the first district of Morelos.
