= Marco Antonio Adame =

Mexican politician

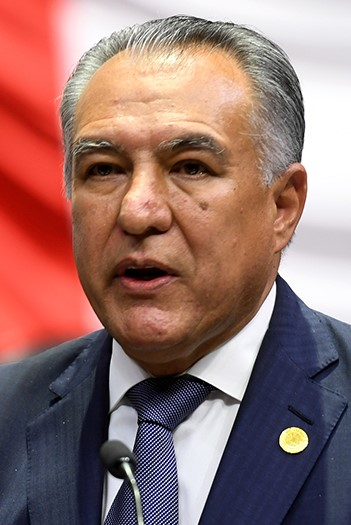
- Marco Antonio Adame

Governor of Morelos
- In office 1 October 2006 – 1 October 2012
- Preceded by: Sergio Estrada Cajigal
- Succeeded by: Graco Ramírez

Personal details
- Born: 6 December 1960 (age 65) Cuernavaca, Morelos
- Party: National Action Party
- Spouse: Mayela Alemán de Adame
- Children: Juan
- Profession: Doctor

Marco Antonio Adame Castillo (born 6 December 1960) is a Mexican politician, medical doctor, and member of the National Action Party (PAN). He served as governor of Morelos for the term of 2006—2012.

Adame studied medicine and surgery at the Universidad Autónoma del Estado de Morelos and has a master's degree in Administration with a specialty in High Technology from the Instituto Tecnológico y de Estudios Superiores de Monterrey ("Tec Monterrey").

He has supported academic activities and collaborated periodically in his home state. He joined the PAN party in 1997, occupying various positions in the State and National Committees, and in that same year he was elected a Diputado Federal (deputy) to the 57th Federal Legislature. In 2000 he was elected to the role of a Senator, representing Morelos.

== Controversy ==
On June 27, 2009, the Fiscalía Especial para la Atención de Delitos Electorales ("Special prosecutor for the attention of electoral crimes") accused Governor Marco Adame of transferring MXN $15 million of state funds to electoral purposes in favor of Sergio Álvarez Mata, candidate for mayor of Cuernavaca and Adriana Vieyra Olivares, candidate for deputy, both members of the National Action Party.

On January 11, 2010, the Mexican government's organized crime division SIEDO received an anonymous tip accusing the governor's bodyguards of being personally linked to the Beltrán-Leyva Cartel. SIEDO has currently opened an investigation.

== Family and personal life ==
Marco Antonio was one of ten siblings, two of whom, Humberto and Edgar, were appointed to public office by Governor Adame Castillo.

Roberto Adame Castillo, 58, brother of Marco Antonio, committed suicide by hanging on June 7, 2013, in Cocoyoc, Morelos.

On May 16, 2019, the body of Marco Adame's brother, Humberto Adame Castillo, was found in a ditch in Alpuyeca, Xochitepec. Unofficial sources say Humberto had been kidnapped. The family paid a ransom of MXN $63,000 just before he was killed. Marco Adame's nephew was robbed while at the funeral on May 17. Three men and two women were arrested in relation to the murder.

== See also ==
- 2006 Morelos state elections
- List of Mexican state governors

Preceded by Sergio Estrada Cajigal	Governor of Morelos; 2006–2012	Succeeded by Graco Ramírez
