= Hesiquio Iriarte =

Mexican painter

Hesiquio Iriarte (c. 1820–1903) was a Mexican painter. He was born and died in Mexico City. Between 1853 and 1855 he created the lithograph called The Pulque Seller. It was purchased by the MUNAL Trust and donated to the National Museum of Art in Mexico City, Mexico in 1992.

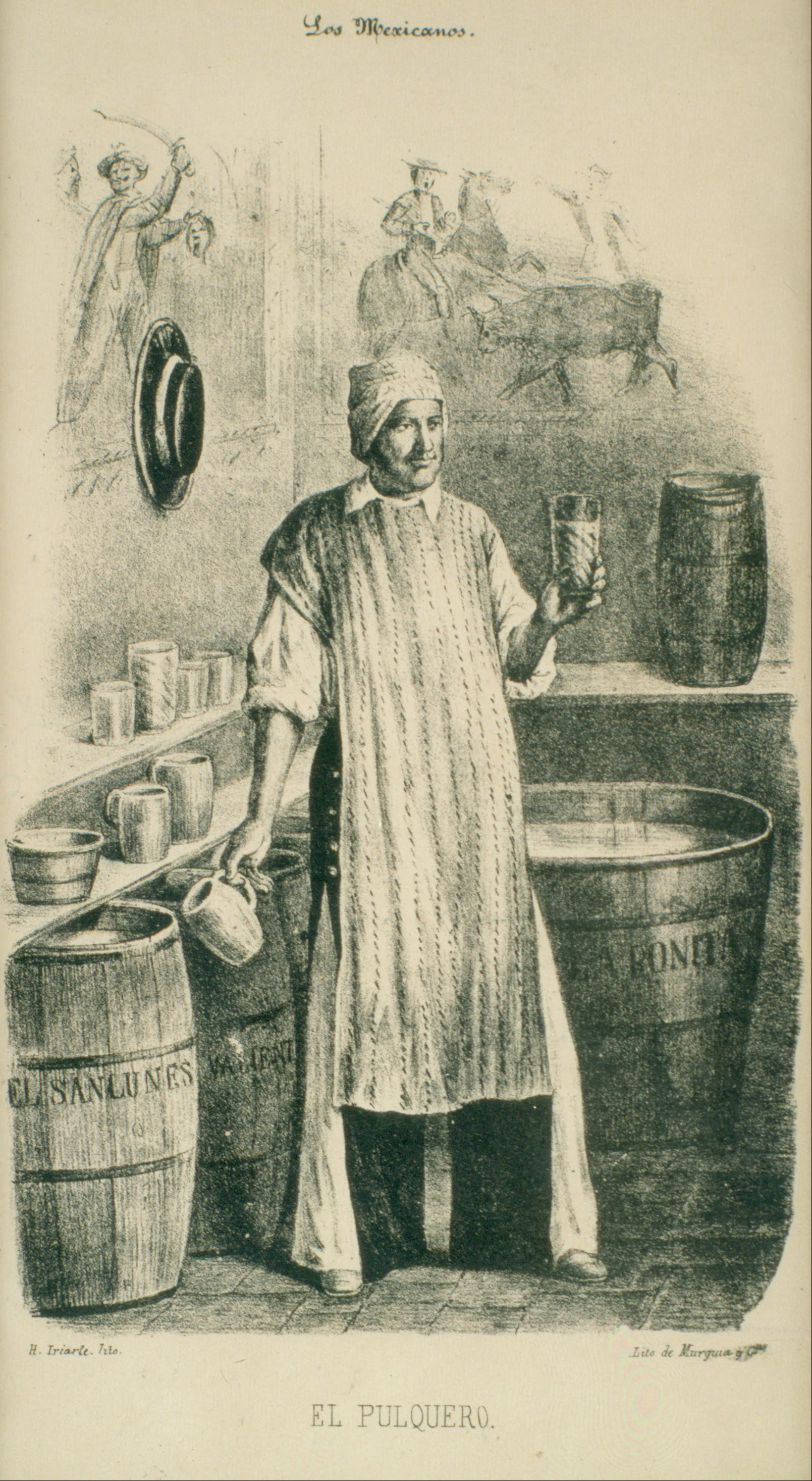
Hesiquio Iriarte - The Pulque Seller - Google Art Project
