= Jesús Giles Sánchez =

Mexican politician

- Born: 9 June 1961; Cuernavaca, Morelos, Mexico
- Died: 15 April 2012 (aged 50); Cuernavaca, Morelos, Mexico
- Occupation: Politician
- Political party: PAN

Jesús Giles Sánchez (9 June 1961 – 15 April 2012) was a Mexican politician from the National Action Party. From 2009 to 2012 he served as Deputy of the LXI Legislature of the Mexican Congress representing Morelos. He also was Mayor of Cuernavaca from 2006 to 2009

Giles died on 15 April 2012 due to cancer.
