= Teopanzolco =

Aztec archaeological site in the Mexican state of Morelos

Coordinates: 18°55′49.61″N 99°13′19.25″W

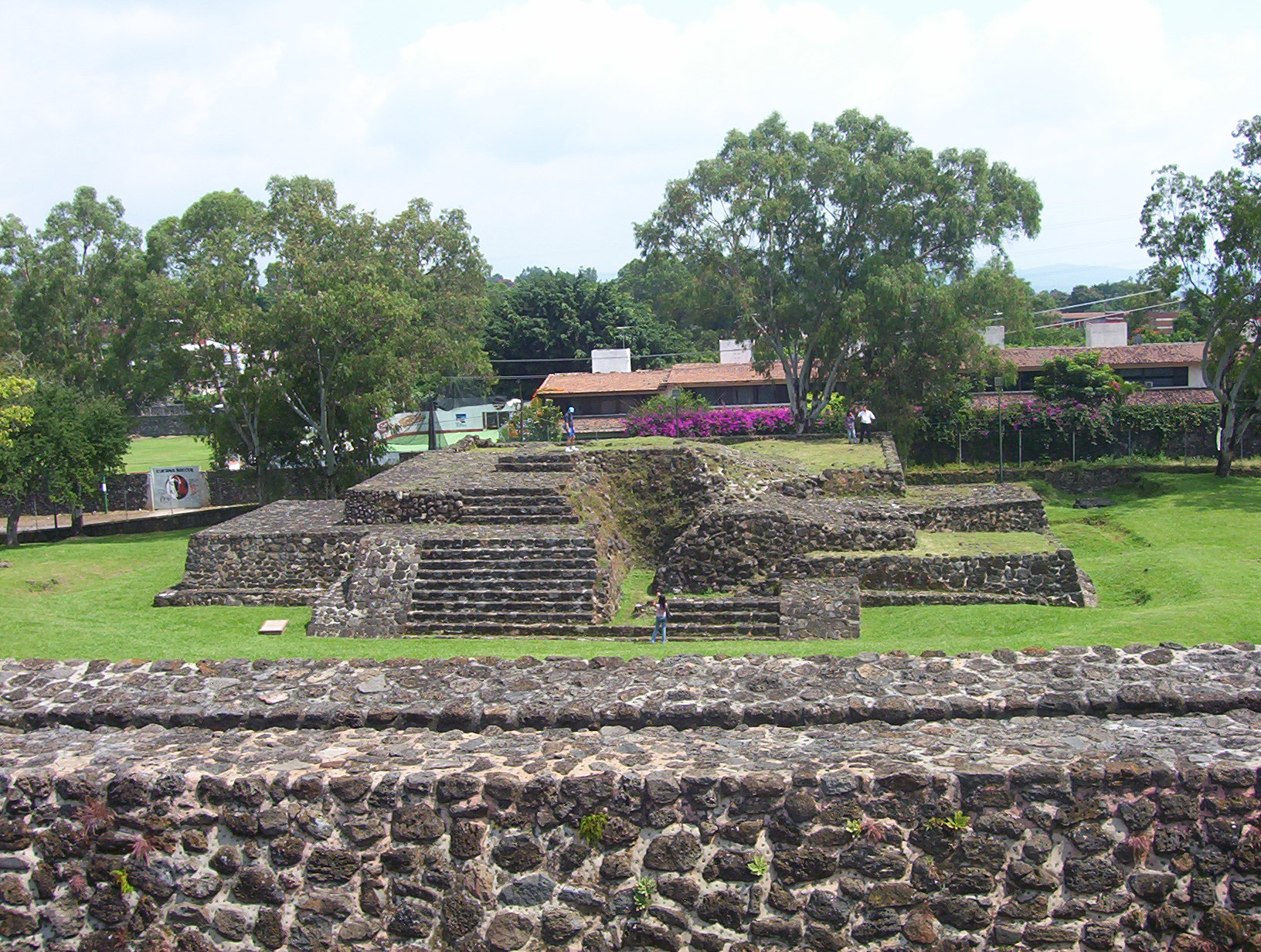
Building 13, the temple of Tezcatlipoca

Teopanzolco is an Aztec archaeological site in the Mexican state of Morelos. Due to urban growth, it now lies within the modern city of Cuernavaca. Most of the visible remains date from the Middle to Late Postclassic Period (1300-1521).

== Etymology ==
Teopanzolco comes from the Nahuatl language; it has been interpreted as "the place of the old temple".

== Location ==
Teopanzolco was built upon a hill formed from a lava flow. Although this area is now occupied by the Vista Hermosa district of Cuernavaca, in pre-Columbian times it was an area of coniferous woodland.

== History of the site ==
The Morelos Valley was settled from about 2000 BC. During the Classic Period, Teopanzolco came under the influence of the great metropolis of Teotihuacan in the Valley of Mexico. By the Postclassic, various Nahua groups had moved into the Altiplano; the Tlahuicas founded nearby Cuauhnahuac (Cuernavaca) and Teopanzolco itself. They were conquered in 1427 AD by the Aztec emperor Moctezuma Ilhuicamina, after which they were integrated into the Aztec Empire and were obliged to pay tribute and participate in Aztec military campaigns. The prehispanic history of Teopanzolco was brought to a close by the Spanish Conquest in 1521, at which time the Tlahuicas were still living in the area and paying tribute to the Aztecs.

Teopanzolco was probably the original centre of the city of Cuauhnahuac during the Early Aztec period (AD 1150–1350) before the ceremonial centre was moved to a more defensible location, now the centre of the modern city of Cuernavaca. After the relocation of the ceremonial centre no new construction was undertaken at Teopanzolco.

The site of Teopanzolco was rediscovered in the 1910s, during the Mexican Revolution, when the revolutionary forces of Emiliano Zapata installed an artillery emplacement upon the Great Platform (Building 1) in order to shell federalist positions in the centre of Cuernavaca. The resulting cannon fire shook loose the soil, revealing the stonework below.

The modern history of Teopanzolco begins with the first excavations at the site in 1921, no further investigations took place until it was excavated in 1956-7 by Mexican archaeologists Román Piña Chan and Eduardo Noguera, who investigated the temple of Ehecatl and established a ceramic sequence for the site. Further archaeological investigations took place in 1968-9 (by Angulo Villaseñor) and in 1980 (by Wanda Tomassi). INAH has undertaken maintenance and minor excavations annually since 1985.

The earthquake of September 19, 2017, damaged the main temple. As archaeologists began repairing the damage, they were surprised to find a smaller, previously unknown temple inside, which presumably was dedicated to Tlaloc, the god of rain. Archaeologists discovered stucco-covered walls, a bench, and a pilaster, which may date to the Posclásico Medio period (A.D. 1150-1200). While more studies need to be undertaken to prove this theory, this would mean that the temple of Teopanzolco predates the Templo Mayor in Mexico City.

== The site ==
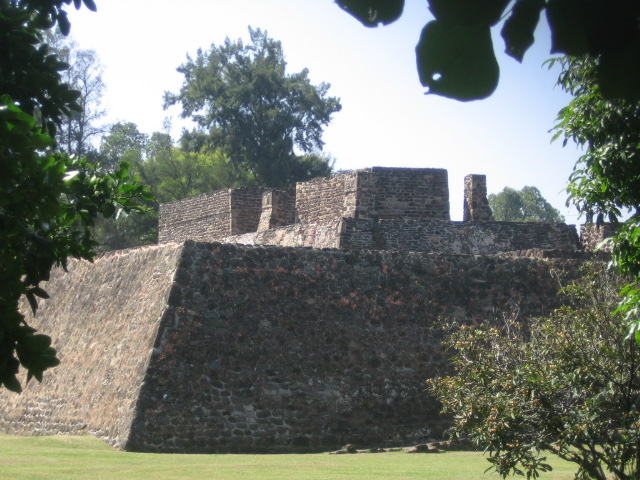
View of the Great Platform, which once supported the twin temples of Tlaloc and Huitzilopochtli

Only the ceremonial centre of Teopanzolco has been preserved. The residential areas of the prehispanic city lie beneath the modern development of Vista Hermosa; for this reason, the actual size of the city is unknown. The surviving remains were built using local basalt. Although nothing survives of the original finishing, the buildings were presumably covered with painted plaster, as at other archaeological sites. Although the site had been developed by both the Tlahuicas and the Aztecs, the dominant architectural style and the majority of the excavated ceramics are Aztec in origin.

- Great Platform or Building 1. This is the principal building within the archaeological zone. It consists of a westward facing rectangular pyramidal base that once supported twin temples; the northernmost was dedicated to Tlaloc, the Aztec rain god, while the southern temple was dedicated to Huitzilopochtli, the god of war. Two parallel stairways give access to the temples. This style of double temple is Aztec in origin. Two phases of building are evident, the second practically identical to the first and built on top of it. Only the platform survives from the second phase but sections of the walls of the twin temples survive from the earlier building phase. The later phase of construction appears to have been interrupted by the Spanish Conquest.
- Temple of Tlaloc This consisted of a small enclosure surrounded by four pillars that presumably supported a wide roof that extended beyond the temple enclosure itself. It is situated upon the Great Platform.
- Temple of Huitzilopochtli This was larger than the temple of Tlaloc and consisted of two rooms, one lying behind the other and accessed through it. The remains of an altar have been found in this inner sanctum . It is situated upon the Great Platform.
- Building 2 This is a low, irregular platform with a wide north-facing stairway.
- Building 3 is a small rectangular platform with an east-facing stairway.
- Building 4 is a wide but shallow rectangular platform with a borderless east-facing stairway. A pit was found in this structure, which contained a great number of human bones together with two obsidian knives. The bones belonged to 35 individuals of both sexes who had been sacrificed and dismembered.
- Building 5 is another small rectangular platform with an east-facing stairway.
- Building 6 is a small rectangular platform with an east-facing stairway.
- Building 7 is a small, low circular platform with an east-facing stairway. It was a shrine dedicated to Ehecatl, the Aztec god of wind, one of the manifestations of Quetzalcoatl. A sunken chamber was found inside this platform, it was filled with offerings of ceramic vessels and human skulls, probably belonging to sacrificial victims.
- Building 8 is a very small rectangular platform with an east-facing stairway.
- Building 9 is another low circular platform. It was another shrine to Ehecatl, slightly larger than the similar Building 7.
- Building 10 is a long rectangular platform running east–west, located behind buildings 3 to 6. It has two stairways facing east and another facing to the west. It appears to have been expanded several times during its history.
- Building 12 is a large platform aligned with the Great Platform, lying directly to the north. It has three west-facing stairways.
- Temple of Tezcatlipoca or Building 13 is directly behind (i.e. to the east of) the Great Platform. Its lower level had a double stairway that faced towards the latter. The upper level has a single, wide stairway. The combination of a cannonball strike during the Mexican Revolution and a large looters' pit has inflicted extensive damage upon the remains.
- Platform 15 was excavated in 1997. It is located at the southern edge of the archaeological site. It was a large platform in a poor state of preservation. Below the platform were found the remains of a residence whose inhabitants manufactured dyes, as evidenced by the discovery of hearths with tools and traces of iron oxide-based pigments. The residence was demolished in order to build the overlying platform, leaving only the foundations containing domestic human burials.

The site is in the care of the Instituto Nacional de Antropología e Historia (National Institute of Anthropology and History) and is open to the public.

== See also ==
- Santa Cecilia Acatitlan
- Templo Mayor
- Tenayuca
- Tlatelolco (archaeological site)
