= Graco Ramírez =

Mexican politician

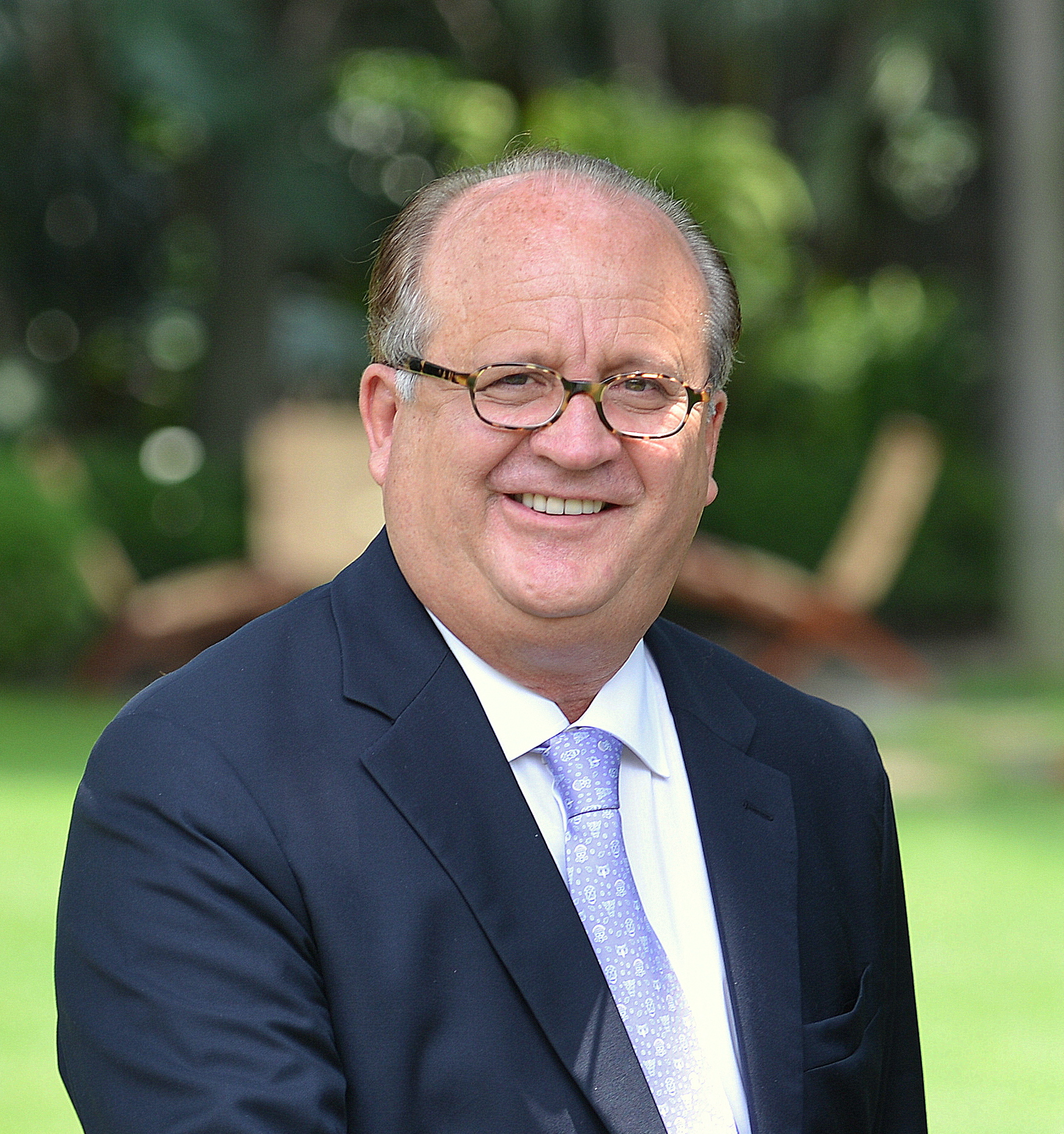
- Ramírez in Mexico, 2014

Governor of Morelos
- In office 1 October 2012 – 1 October 2018
- Preceded by: Marco Antonio Adame
- Succeeded by: Cuauhtémoc Blanco

President of the National Conference of Governors
- In office 19 November 2016 – 3 May 2017
- Preceded by: Gabino Cué Monteagudo
- Succeeded by: Miguel Angel Mancera

Personal details
- Born: June 26, 1949 (age 77) Villahermosa, Tabasco
- Party: PRD (since 1989); PMS (1987–1989); PST (1975–1987)
- Spouse: Elena Cepeda
- Profession: Lawyer

Graco Luis Ramírez Garrido Abreu (born 26 June 1949) is a Mexican left-wing politician affiliated with the Democratic Revolution Party (PRD) who was Governor of Morelos for the 2012–2018 term. He served in the upper house of Congress as senator representing the State of Morelos (2006–2012).

== Personal life and education ==
Ramírez holds a bachelor's degree in law from the National Autonomous University of Mexico (UNAM). He is the son of a member of the Mexican armed forces.

== Political career ==
On several occasions, Ramirez stated that he was a leader of the student movement that culminated in the Tlatelolco massacre of October 2, 1968; at least one leader has challenged this assertion.

Ramírez began his political career as an Institutional Revolutionary Party (PRI) member; he served as president of the PRI in Tabasco. He then joined the Workers' Socialist Party (PST). In July 1987, it was announced that a faction of the PST led by Ramírez would join the newly-founded Mexican Socialist Party (PMS). The PMS dissolved in 1989 and he joined the Party of the Democratic Revolution.

As the leader of the Morelos state legislature in 1995, Graco Ramirez led the first of several marches against then-governor Jorge Carrillo Olea because of alleged ties to drug trafficking and kidnapping. Carrillo was forced to resign in 1998.

Graco Ramírez has served more than one term in the lower house of Congress. In 2006 he was elected senator, hence he served in the upper house of Congress during the LX and LXI Legislatures (2006–2012). As senator, he promoted laws to allow independent candidates and citizen initiatives and consultations.

Graco Ramirez was elected Governor of Morelos in 2012. As governor, Ramirez was known as a progressive who supported women's rights and scholarships for needy students. In an effort to combat high crime rates in the state, Graco initiated a police reform program called Mando Unico wherein all the state and local police forces were united under a single command. Despite a promising start, both poverty and crime increased in the state; the "Mando Unico" in particular was accused of numerous human rights violations, and it was seen as a political organism. In 2016 an audit of the state university, UAEM revealed a shortfall of millions of pesos. Governor Ramirez and Alejandro Vera, the rector of the university, mutually accused one another of deviating funds for other purposes. Faced with the loss of their pensions, faculty and staff went on strike; a student march was supported by the Catholic bishop, Ramon Castro Castro. Then, following the earthquake of September 19, 2017, Graco and his wife were accused of seizing much-needed humanitarian aid destined for earthquake victims. By February, 2018, the man once considered a leading candidate for President of Mexico was the least popular governor in the country.

In a controversial move, Graco chose his stepson, Rodrigo Gayosso as PRD candidate for governor in 2018. Swept up in Andrés Manuel López Obrador's wave, Cuernavaca mayor Cuauhtémoc Blanco of the Juntos Haremos Historia (Together we will make history) coalition won the election.

== Criminal accusations ==
On February 13, 2019, Cuauhtemoc Blanco formally accused Graco Ramirez; his wife, Elena Cepeda; his stepson, Rodrigo Gayosso; and a notary public, Javier Barona; for the crimes of organized crime, operations with resources of illicit origin, and tax fraud. On September 27, 2019, the government of the state of Morelos formally solicited a political trial against Ramirez due to his refusal to provide the Attorney General and the Electoral Commission sufficient funds with which to operate. Although the Electoral Commission requested MXN $35 million for the 2018 election, Ramirez provided on MXN $18 million. El Universal reports that Ramirez is being investigated for deviating funds of MXN $100 million related to concerts by Sting, Emmanuel, and Mijares. There are receipts that show Sting was paid USD $2,000,000 for a concert, but he had been paid on USD $900,000 for a similar concert in Viña del Mar, Chile.

Blanco alleged in September 2020 that he had proof that Graco and Alberto Capella Ibarra had an agreement with organized crime while Ramírez Garrido Abreu was governor.

== See also ==
- List of people from Morelos

Political offices
| Preceded by Marco Antonio Adame | Governor of Morelos; 2012–2018 | Succeeded by Cuauhtémoc Blanco |
