= Mariano Riva Palacio =

Mexican politician

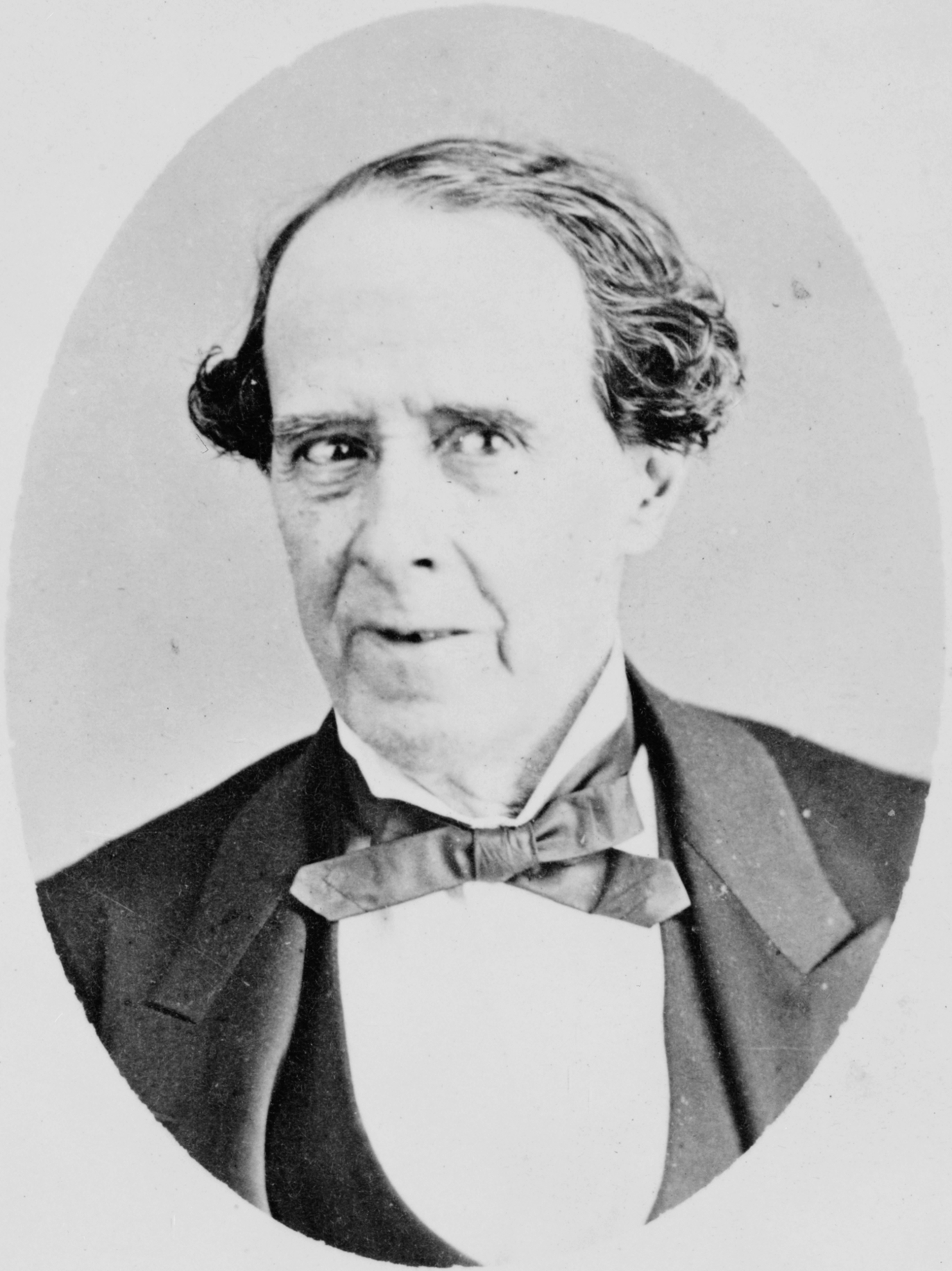

Governor of the State of Mexico
- In office 29 September 1869 – 18 October 1870
- Preceded by: Antonio Zimbrón
- Succeeded by: Valentín Gómez Tagle
- In office 6 January 1857 – 4 July 1857
- Preceded by: Plutarco González
- Succeeded by: Francisco Iturbe
- In office 31 August 1849 – 3 May 1852
- Preceded by: Mariano Arizcorreta
- Succeeded by: Luis Madrid

Minister of Finance
- In office June 1848 – August 1848

Minister of Justice
- In office 1851–1851

Personal details
- Born: 4 November 1803 Mexico City
- Died: 20 February 1880 (aged 76) Mexico City, Mexico
- Profession: Lawyer

Mariano Riva Palacio Díaz (Note: In this Spanish name, the first or paternal surname is Riva Palacio and the second or maternal family name is Díaz.) (4 November 1803 – 20 February 1880) was a Mexican politician and lawyer during most of the 19th century.

He was born in Mexico City to Esteban de la Riva Palacio and María Dolores Díaz and married Dolores Guerrero Hernández, daughter of Gen. Vicente Guerrero, one of the most prominent leaders of the Mexican War of Independence. With Dolores he had 6 children, including the politician and writer Vicente Riva Palacio and daughter María Rosa Riva Palacio, who went on to marry the general and politician, Ignacio Zaragoza. Mariano served as a city councilor for Mexico City (1829), federal congressman (1833), minister of justice (1851), minister of finance (June–August 1848) and was elected thrice governor of the State of Mexico (1849, 1857, 1871).

He was also the lawyer appointed to defend the deposed Emperor Maximilian.
