= Vicente Riva Palacio =

Mexican politician

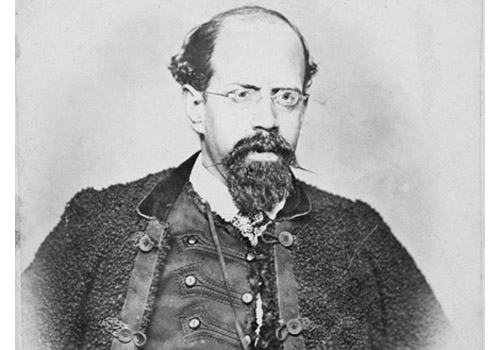
- Born: Vicente Florencio Carlos Riva Palacio Guerrero; 16 October 1832; Mexico City, First Mexican Republic
- Died: 22 November 1896 (aged 64); Madrid, Spain
- Occupation: Politician

Vicente Florencio Carlos Riva Palacio Guerrero (Note: In this Spanish name, the first or paternal surname is Riva Palacio and the second or maternal family name is Guerrero.) better known as Vicente Riva Palacio (16 October 1832 – 22 November 1896) was a Mexican liberal politician, novelist, journalist, intellectual, historian, and military leader.

Riva Palacio was born in Mexico City. His father was Mariano Riva Palacio, a moderate liberal, and his mother was María de los Dolores Guerrero Hernández, daughter of independence hero and president of Mexico Vicente Guerrero and María de Guadalupe Hernández. Vicente's father worked for the Emperor Maximilian I of Mexico in Querétaro during the Second French intervention, but Riva Palacio led forces in defense of the Mexican Republic against the French-backed empire.

== Life ==
In 1845 Riva Palacio entered college at San Gregorio, graduating in 1854 with a law degree. Riva Palacio was not only a lawyer but a general, diplomat, politician, historian and a writer. After Riva Palacio received his degree in law he continued working while going to war. Riva Palacio participated in the liberal Plan of Ayutla that ousted Antonio López de Santa Anna and fought against the Second French intervention (1862–67). In 1858 and through April 1860, he was in prison because of his liberal ideas. After prison, he became member of the Chamber of Deputies, its president in 1861, and wrote for the newspaper La Orquesta. In 1862, Riva Palacio became governor of the State of Mexico. Then in 1865, he founded and published a newspaper called El Pito Real. Also in 1865, he became governor of Michoacán due to the death of General José María Arteaga, Riva Palacio was then named general and chief of the central army. In 1867 he published another newspaper called El Radical, which lasted until 1873. After El Radical he published another newspaper called El Hijo del Ahuizote. In 1876 he resigned as governor to dedicate himself to writing. During the dictatorship of Porfirio Díaz in 1884, he was accused of conspiracy and was imprisoned, where he wrote his second volume of what became the five-volume México a través de los siglos. After prison Riva Palacio retired from the military and left for Spain where he met Spanish artists and politicians. In 1896, Vicente Riva Palacio died in Madrid.

== Works ==
Riva Palacio published in several different genres: history, poetry, novels, and theatrical works. His writings have been the subject of scholarly study.

He was a successful journalist publishing in famous newspapers as La Orquesta, El Ahuizote, and others. In his participation in newspapers he developed an ensayistic approach characterized by a satirical, critical and ingenious pen.

Novels

- Calvario y tabor
- Monja y casada, virgen y mártir
- Martín Garatuza
- Las dos emparedadas: Memorias de la Inquisición
- Los piratas del golfo
- La vuelta de los muertos
- Memorias de un impostor: Don Guillén de Lampart, rey de México
- Un secreto que mata

Books of poetry

- Flores de alma
- Páginas en verso
- Mis versos

Theatrical works written in collaboration

- Las liras hermanas

Histories and criticisms

- Historia de la administración de don Sebastián Lerdo de Tejada
- Los ceros
- México a través de los siglos, v.2, El virreinato
- El libro rojo (in collaboration)

Stories and legends

- Cuentos de un loco
- Cuentos del general
- Tradiciones y leyendas mexicanas (in collaboration)
- El abanico
