= Governor of Morelos =

Chief executive of the Mexican state of Morelos

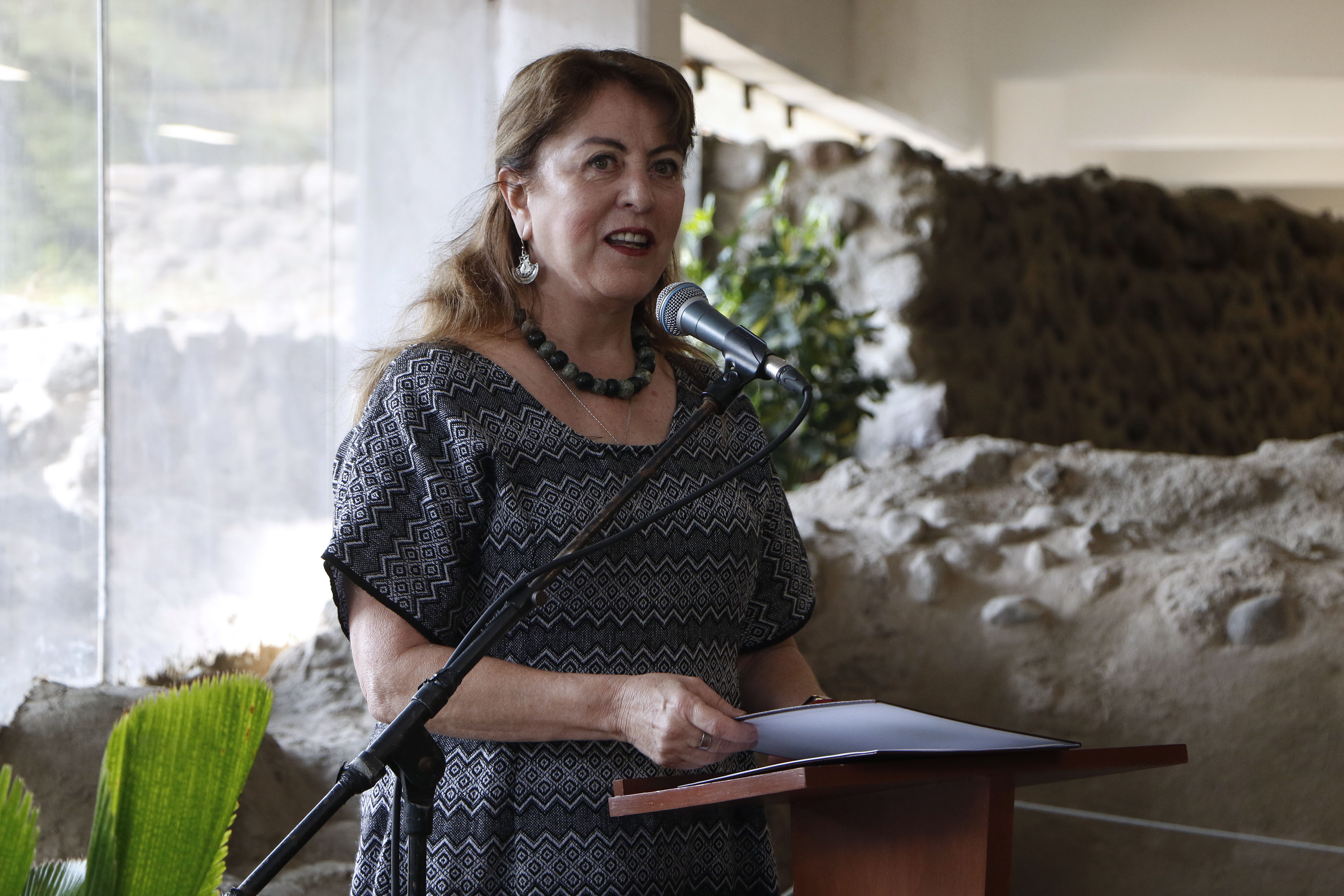
- Incumbent; Margarita González Saravia since October 1, 2024
- Term length: Six years, non-renewable.
- Inaugural holder: Pedro Baranda
- Formation: 1869

The governor of Morelos was created with the state of Mexico in 1869. (Morelos was a Federal Territory from June 17, 1914, to February 5, 1917.)

Name	Party	Term
Margarita González Saravia	MRN	Constitutional (2024–present)
Cuauhtémoc Blanco	MRN (Note: Together We Will Make History coalition)	Constitutional (2018–2024)
Graco Ramírez	PRD	Constitutional (2012–2018)
Marco Antonio Adame Castillo	PAN	Constitutional (2006–2012)
Sergio Estrada Cajigal	PAN	Constitutional (2000–2006)
Jorge Arturo García Rubí	PRI	Interim (2000)
Jorge Morales Barud	PRI	Substitute (1998–2000)
Jorge Carrillo Olea	PRI	Constitutional (1994–1998)
Antonio Riva Palacio López	PRI	Constitutional (1988–1994)
Lauro Ortega Martínez	PRI	Constitutional (1982–1988)
Armando León Bejarano	PRI	Constitutional (1976–1982)
Felipe Rivera Crespo	PRI	Constitutional (1970–1976)
Emilio Riva Palacio	PRI	Constitutional (1964–1970)
Norberto López Avelar	PRI	Constitutional (1958–1964)
Rodolfo López de Nava	PRI	Constitutional (1952–1958)
Ernesto Escobar Muñoz	PRI	Constitutional (1946–1952)
Jesús Castillo López	PRM	Constitutional (1942–1946)
Elpidio Perdomo	PRM	Constitutional (1938–1942)
Alfonso Sámano Torres (Note: Listed as Alfonso Sámano Torres and Alfonso T. Sámano)	PRM	Interim (1938)
José Refugio Bustamante	PNR	Constitutional (1934–1938)
Vicente Estrada Cajigal	PSRM (Note: Socialist Revolutionary Pary of Morelos, affiliated with PNR (National Revolutionary Party))	Constitutional (1930–1934) (Note: Constitution of November 20, 1930)
Carlos Lavín	PNR	Provisional (1930)
Ambrosio Puente		Interim (1927–1930)
Alfonso María Figueroa Pedroza		Provisional (1926–1927)
Heraclio Rodríguez		Provisional (1926)
Alvaro Alcárar		Provisional (1926)
Valentín de Llano		Provisional (1926)
Joaquín Rojas Hidalgo		Provisional (1925–1926)
Octavio Paz Solórzano		Provisional (1925)
Ismael Velazco		Provisional (1924–1925)
Amilcar Magaña		Encargado de Despacho (1924)
Alfredo Ortega		Encargado de Despacho (1923–1924)
Joaquín Paez López (Note: Listed as Joaquín Paez López and José Páez López)		Encargado de Despacho (1923)
José G. Parres Guerrero		Interim (1920–1923)
Luis Flores Martínez		Interim (1920)
Juan María Rodríguez		Interim (1920)
Benito Tajonar		Provisional (1919–1920) (Note: First post-revolutionary civilian governor)
José G. Aguilar		Provisional (1919) (Note: Morelos was restored as a state on February 5, 1917)
Dionisio Carreón		Provisional (1916)
Lorenzo Vázquez		Provisional (1915-1916)
Genovevo de la O		Substitute (1914-1915)
Pedro Ojeda		Political Chief of Territory (1914)
Gregorio G. Mejía		Provisional (1914)
Agustín Bretón y Trillanes		Military Governor (1914) (Note: On February 17, 1914, Morelos was decreed a federal territory.)
Adolfo Jiménez Castro		Provisional and Chief of the Division of the South (1913)
Julián Arreola		Provisional (1913)
Juvencio Robles		Military Governor (1913) (Note: First military governor)
Benito Tajonar		Interim (1913)
Francisco Sánchez		Substitute (1913)
Patricio Leyva Ochoa		(1912-1913) (Note: Constitution of 1880)
Aniceto Villamar Velázquez		Provisional (1912)
Francisco Naranjo		Provisional (1912)
Ambrosio Figueroa		Provisional (1911-1912)
Juan Nepomuceno Carreón		Provisional (1911)
Francisco Leyva Arciniegas		Interim (1911) (Note: First Maderist governor)
Pablo Escandón Barrón		Constitutional (1909-1911) (Note: Constitution of 1880)
Manuel Alarcón		Interim & Constitutional & Re-elected (1894-1908)
Jesús H. Preciado		Constitutional (1885-1895)
Carlos Quaglia Zimbrón		Interim & Constitutional (1880-1884) (Note: Constitution of 1880)
Carlos Pacheco Villalobos		Constitutional (1876-1880)
Francisco Leyva Arciniegas		Constitutional (1869-1876) (Note: First Constitutional governor; Constitution of 1869)
Pedro Sáinz de Baranda		Provisional (1869) (Note: First Provisional governor)

== See also ==
- List of Mexican state governors
- List of people from Morelos
- List of governors of dependent territories in the 20th century
