= Cuernavaca =

Cuernavaca Cuauhnāhuac
- City
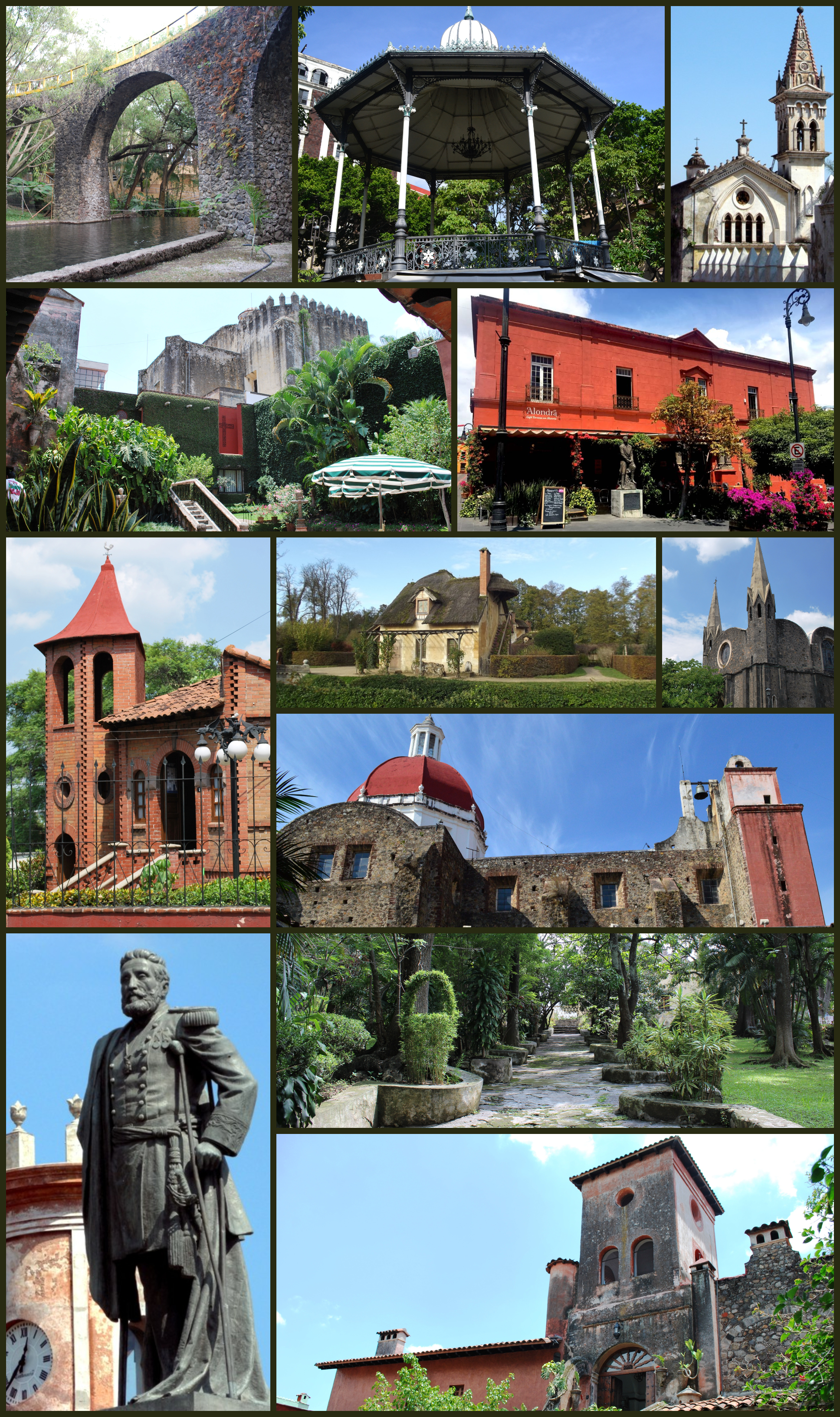
- From top, left to right: Train bridge in the Chapultepec Ecological Park, Kiosk in Jardín Juárez, Chapel of Our Lady of Mount Carmel, Inner courtyard of the Robert Brady Museum, Restaurant Alondra (Historic Center), El Castillito, Side facade of the entrance to Villa Cuauhnáhuac, Chapitel del Calvario, View of the dome of the Parish of Our Lady of Guadalupe, General Carlos Pacheco Villalobos Monument, Borda Garden, Tower of the Robert Brady Museum

- Flag Coat of arms Brandmark
- Nickname: "City of Eternal Spring"
- Location in Mexico Cuernavaca (Mexico)
- Coordinates: 18°55′07″N 99°14′03″W
- Country: Mexico
- State: Morelos
- Municipality: Cuernavaca
- Founded: 1714
- Municipal status: 1821

Government
  - Mayor: José Luis Urióstegui (PAN)

Area
  - City: 151.2 km^{2} (58.4 sq mi)
- Elevation (of seat): 1,510 m (4,950 ft)

Population (2020)
  - City: 341,029 (1st in Morelos)
  - Density: 2,250/km^{2} (5,800/sq mi)
  - Metro: 1,028,589

GDP (PPP, constant 2015 values)
  - Year: 2023
  - Total: $19.0 billion
- Time zone: UTC−6 (CST)
- Postal code (of seat): 62000
- Area code: 777
- Website: (in Spanish) www.cuernavaca.gob.mx

Cuernavaca (Note: Spanish pronunciation: [kweɾnaˈβaka]; Classical Nahuatl: Cuauhnāhuac [kʷawˈnaːwak], "near the woods" modern pronunciation, Otomi: Ñu'iza) is the capital and largest city of the state of Morelos in Mexico. Along with Chalcatzingo, it is likely one of the origins of the Mesoamerican civilization. Olmec works of art, displayed in the Museum of Anthropology in Mexico City, were found in the Gualupita III archeological site.

The city is located south of Mexico City, reachable via a 90-minute drive along the Federal Highway 95D.

The name Cuernavaca is a euphonism derived from the Nahuatl toponym Cuauhnāhuac and means 'surrounded by or close to trees'. The name was Hispanicized to Cuernavaca; Hernán Cortés called it Coadnabaced in his letters to Charles V, Holy Roman Emperor, and Bernal Díaz del Castillo used the name Cuautlavaca in his chronicles. The coat-of-arms of the municipality is based on the pre-Columbian pictograph emblem of the city that depicts a tree trunk (cuahuitl) with three branches, with foliage, and four roots colored red. There is a cut in the trunk in the form of a mouth, from which emerges a speech scroll, probably representing the language Nahuatl and by extension the locative suffix -nāhuac, meaning 'near'.

Cuernavaca has long been a favorite escape for Mexico City residents and foreign visitors because of its warm, stable climate and abundant vegetation. The municipality was designated a Forest Protection Zone by President Lázaro Cárdenas in 1937 to protect the aquifers, the vegetation, and the quality of life of residents, both in Mexico City and locally. The city was nicknamed the "City of Eternal Spring" by Alexander von Humboldt in the 19th century.

== The city ==
=== City of Eternal Spring ===
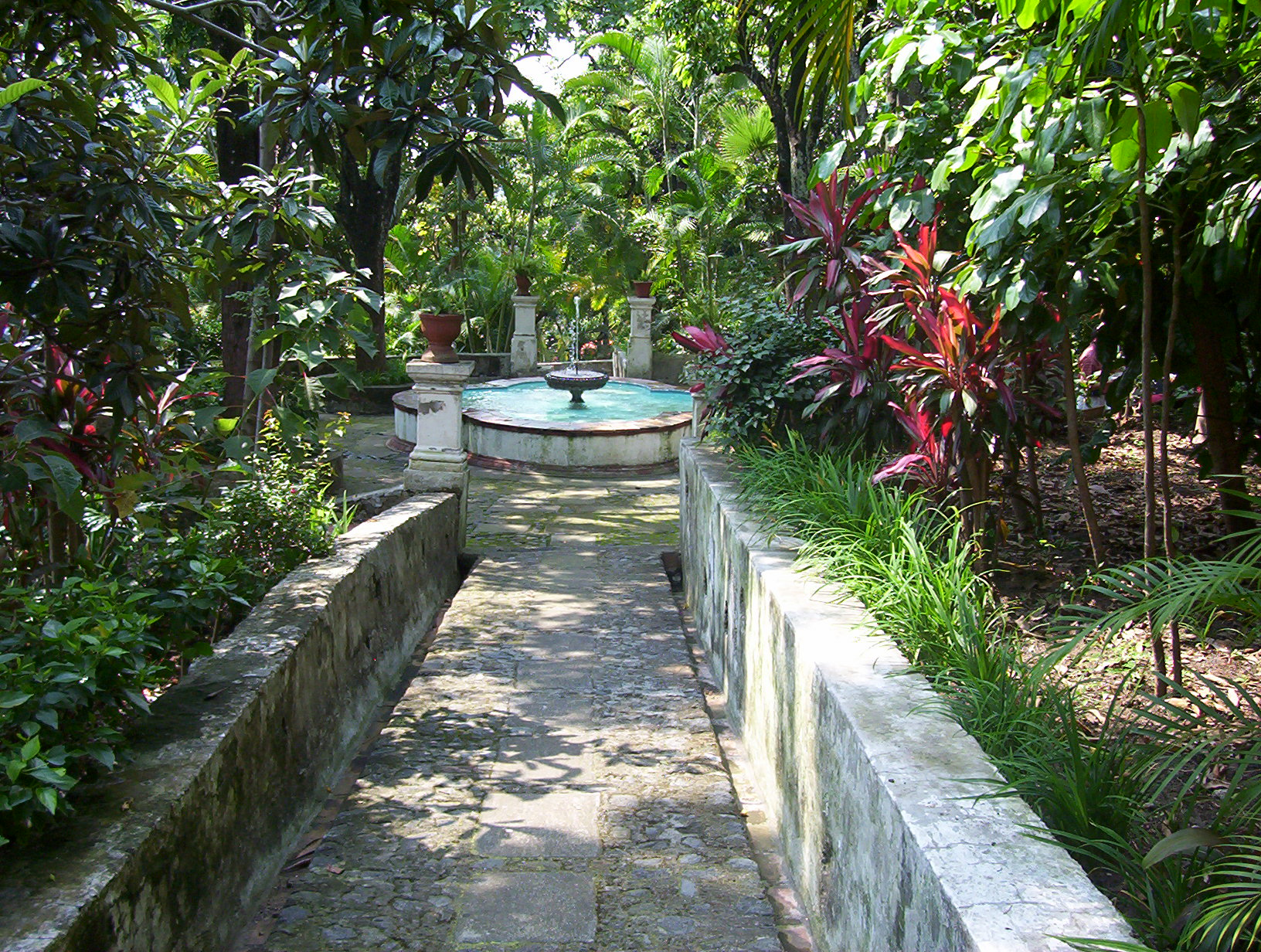
Flora in the Jardín Borda

Cuernavaca was one of the cities of the world nicknamed "City of Eternal Spring". This appelative derived from Alexander von Humboldt's Researches concerning the institutions & monuments of the ancient inhabitants of America...:

To the south east of the city of Cuernavaca (the ancient Quauhnahuac), on the western declivity of the Cordillera of Anahuac, in that happy region, designated by the inhabitants under the name of tierra templada (temperate region) because it is the reign of perpetual spring, rises an insolated hill, which, according to the barometrical measurement of Mr. Alzate, is one hundred and seven metres high.

— Humboldt (1810)

The city is located in a tropical region, but its temperature is fairly constant at 21–26 °C (70–79 °F). It is located on the southern slope of the Sierra de Chichinautzin mountains. In the morning, warm air flows up the mountains from the valley below and in the late afternoon, cooler air flows down from the higher elevations. One ubiquitous flowering plant in the city is the bougainvillea.

This pleasant climate has attracted royalty and nobles since Aztec times. Foreign princes, archdukes, and other nobles have been attracted to this place because of its flowers, sun, fruits, fresh-water springs, and waterfalls. Emperor Maximilian I of Mexico set up a country residence in the city. Philanthropist Barbara Hutton, who held several aristocratic titles through marriage, had a home on the outskirts of the city. Princess Maria Beatrice of Savoy (b. 1943) lived there from 1971 to 1999, and the Shah of Iran, Mohammad Reza Pahlavi, lived in exile in the city following the Iranian Revolution. Although a native of the U.S., Bauhaus designer Michael van Beuren established his residence in a family hacienda in Cuernavaca while fleeing the rise of the Nazi regime in Germany (where he studied and practiced his profession), and a colony of Bauhaus designers grew in the city during World War II.

=== Cuernavaca metropolitan area ===
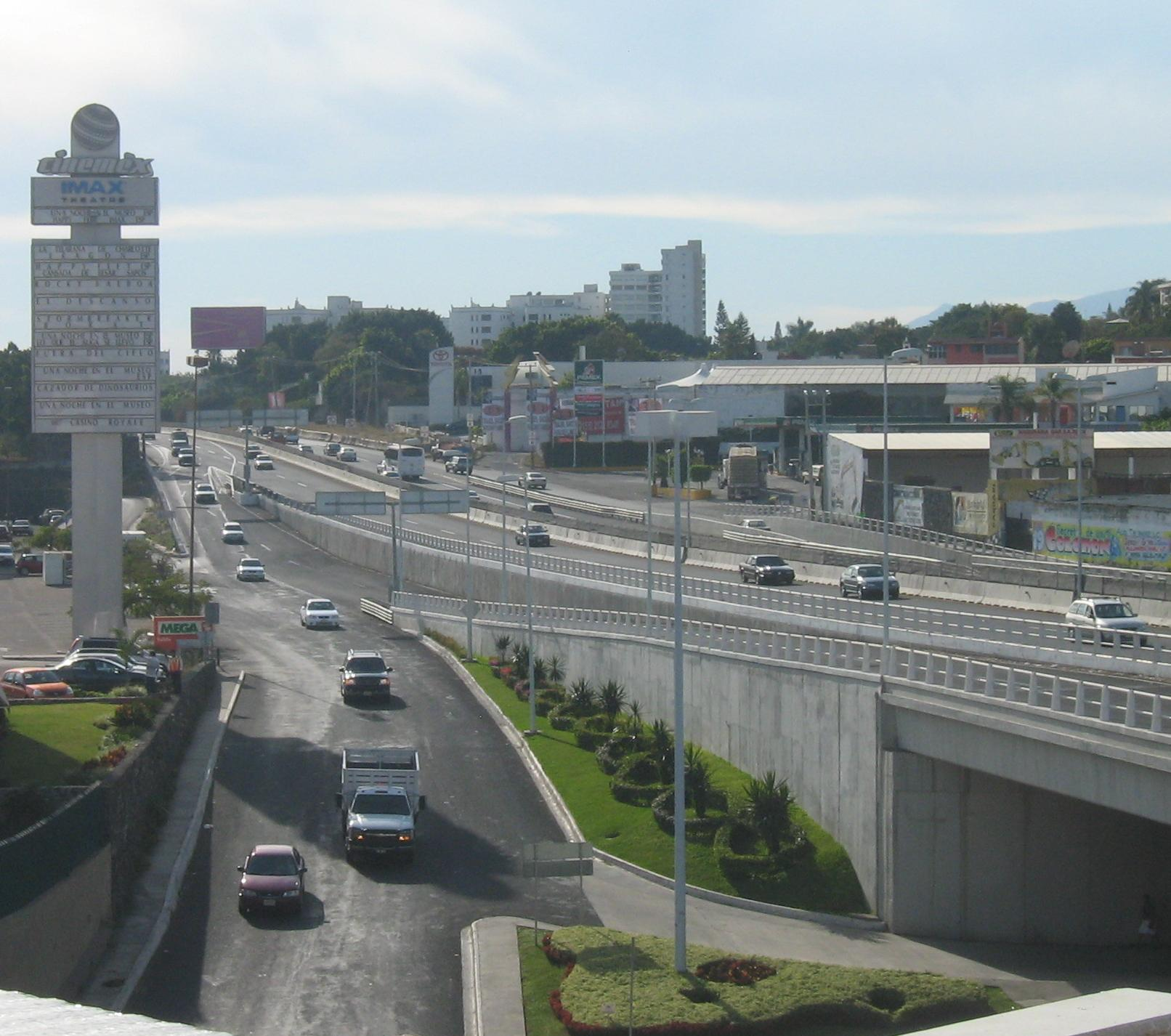
Highway in the newer area of the city

Cuernavaca always has been a popular place for people from Mexico City to escape the city. In the 20th century, the climate and flora began to attract many foreigners as well. Population increase in this urban area began in 1940, but the metro area was not created, nor recognized, until the 1960s. From this time the population and the extension of the metropolitan area have grown. From 1960 to 1980, the population had grown from 85,620 to 368,166. From the 1980s to the present, the municipalities of Emiliano Zapata, Jiutepec, Temixco, Tepoztlán, and Xochitepec have been added to the metropolitan area. These municipalities have seen the highest rates of growth, however; population and economic activity remain concentrated in the city of Cuernavaca proper. The metropolitan area has a population of 912,024 and the municipality has 366,321 inhabitants, as of 2015.

Over the decades since 1970, this metropolitan area has become more economically and socially integrated with the Mexico City metropolitan area. Many people from Mexico City own second homes there for weekend retreats, both for the climate and for the well-developed infrastructure. Starting in the 1980s permanent migration of Mexico City residents began, spurred by pollution and crime problems in the capital. The 1985 Mexico City earthquake also pushed many well-to-do families there, fearful of the next catastrophe. In many of these cases, the main breadwinner commutes each day to work in Mexico City. This has produced a considerable increase in housing developments on the outskirts of the city, especially in the late 1990s and 2000s. This influx has had a positive economic benefit for the city but has put pressure on the infrastructure as well. 85% of the city of Cuernavaca is dedicated to housing, and much of this is in middle-class housing developments such as Rancho Cortés, Rancho Tetela, and Colonia del Bosque, which are located on the outskirts of the city. Lower-income housing is concentrated in the city proper.

== History ==
=== Indigenous peoples ===
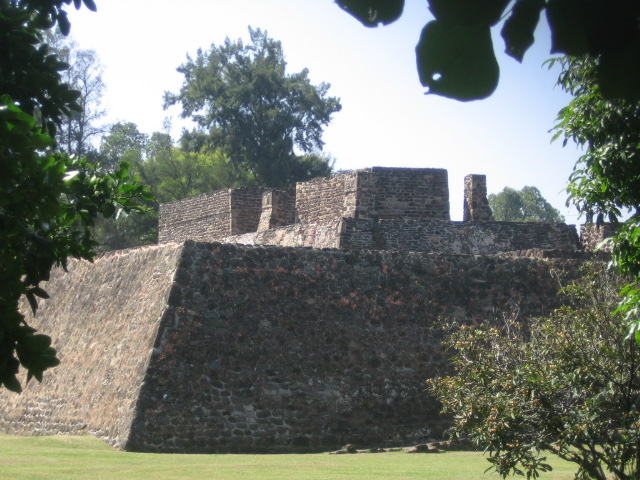
Ruins at Teopanzolco, Cuernavaca

Burials dated to c. 1000 BCE have been found in Gualupita, Morelos, in the north of the city.

The first major culture to inhabit this area was the Tlahuica, a Nahua people whose main settlement was where the city of Cuernavaca is today. The Tlahuicas have inhabited this area at least since the 12th century. Matlatzincas could also be found in this region as late as the nineteenth century.

The first incursions south into the area by peoples of the Valley of Mexico occurred in the 12th century, when a lord named King Xolotl (ruler of Tetzcoco) conquered most of the Valley of Mexico. An allied Chichimeca tribe also moved south into what is now northern Morelos state, making Techintecuitla lord of the Cuauhnahuac (as they called the city) area, with the Tlahuicas concentrated in the nearby towns of Yecapixtla and Yautecatle. According to the Tlatelolco Annals, in 1365, the lord of Cuauhnahuac, Macuilxochitl, tried to conquer lands as far as the Valley of Mexico, but was met by the lord of Chalco, Tzalcualtitlan, with similar ambitions. Cuauhnahuac grew to rule over most of what is now the western portion of the state of Morelos.

The first Aztec emperor, Acamapichtli, began to expand his empire to the south of the Valley of Mexico and beyond in the 1370s. His successor, Huitzilihuitl, was eager to press on into what is now Morelos state because of the cotton grown there, it was called Tlalnahuatl at that time. He asked to marry the daughter of the ruler of Tlalnahuatl but was rejected. That rejection started a war that ended with an Aztec victory in 1396. Huitziliuitl then married the princess and Moctezuma I was born of the union. Credit for the conquest of Cuernavaca is given to Acamapichtli in the Mendocino Codex, but later writings cite Itzcóatl, or even Moctezuma I, as the conqueror. The conquered dominion, Tlalnahuac, was roughly the size of the modern state of Morelos, and subsequently was renamed as Cuauhnahuac by the Aztecs. The local elite came to cooperate with the Mexica through marriages, gift exchanges and ceremonies, as a way to grow their own power. Besides cotton, the region also provided Tenochtitlan with amate paper and flowers for use in ceremonies. During the reign of Ahuitzotl, merchants from Cuauhnahuac travelled as far as Tehuantepec.

From 1403 to 1426, this province grew in strength, subduing neighboring peoples such as the Coauixcas. Eventually, the province, then ruled by Miquiuix, rebelled against the Aztec Empire. This rebellion was put down by Totoquihuatzin and Netzahualcoyotl in 1433. This area then joined in the conquests of what now are known as Taxco, Tepecuacuilco, and Ocuilán, and also fought wars with Huejotzingo, Tepoztlán, and Malinalco. For tribute purposes, the dominion was divided into two zones, one headed by Cuauhnahuac and the other by Huaxtepec.

=== Spanish Conquest and colonization ===
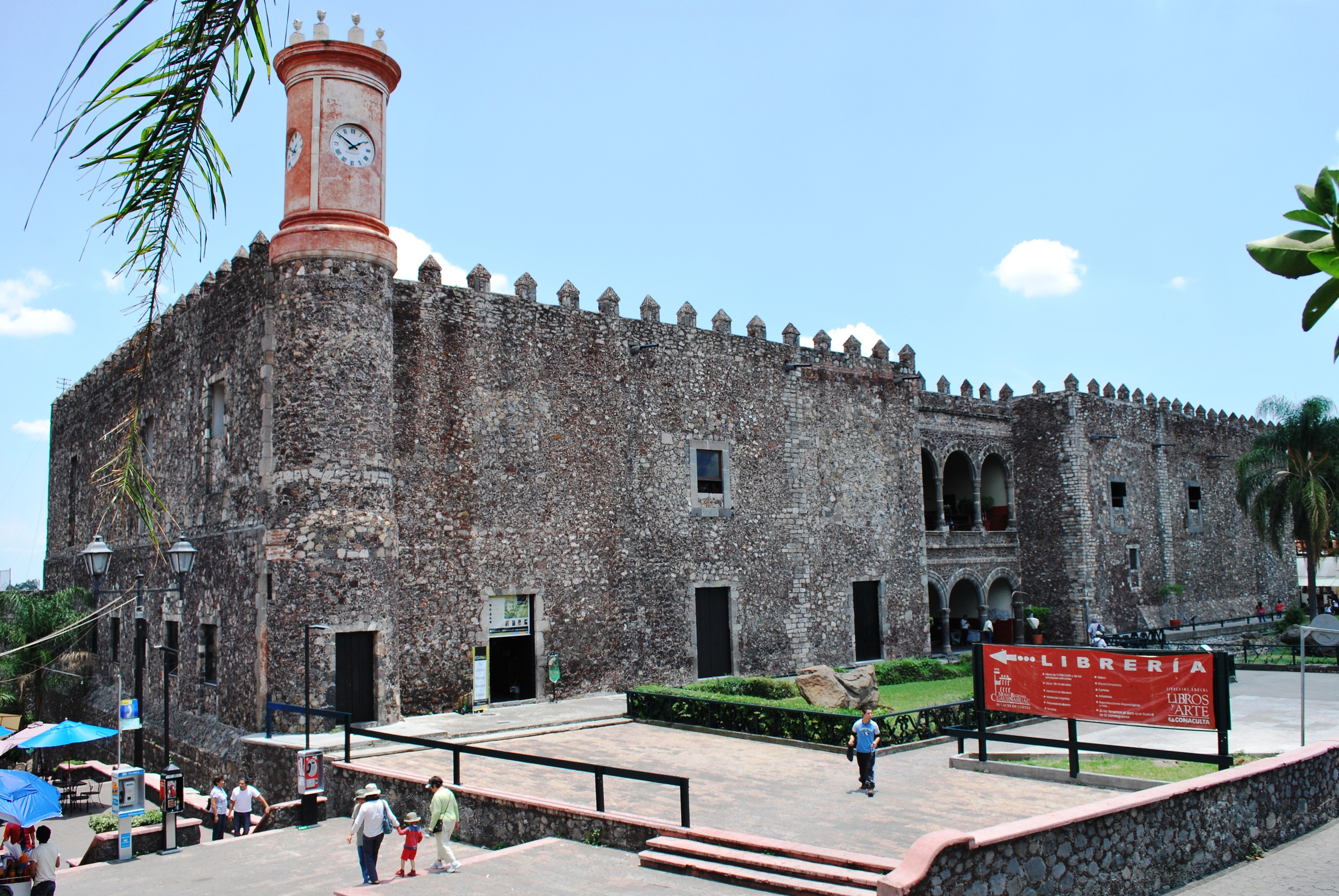
View of the Palace of Cortés, the oldest conserved colonial era civil structure on the continental Americas

At the time of the Spanish Conquest, Itzohuatzin was governing Cuauhnahuac. It was a rich city and densely populated, with large farms and its characteristic ravines bridged over. The Spanish marched on Cuernavaca even before taking the Aztec capital of Tenochtitlan. They were led by Gonzalo de Sandoval and he was joined later by the conquistador, Hernán Cortés. The bridges were destroyed to prevent the Spanish from entering the city, but they were able to cross on a fallen tree. The Spanish troops pillaged and burned the city before retiring to nearby Acapantzingo, where they celebrated the first mass in Morelos on Sunday, 14 April 1521, before continuing their march on the capital. The Spanish had difficulty pronouncing the Nahua name of the city and changed it to Cuernavaca.

Cortés returned to Cuernavaca in 1523, stopping in Tlaltenango, where he founded the Church of San José and constructed the first sugar plantation. The fertility of these lands compelled the conquistador to found his favorite residence here. Juana de Zúñiga, Cortes's wife, lived in Cuernavaca in the palace that was constructed in 1526. Cortes then moved the hacienda in Tlaltenango to Amatitlan. The Franciscans arrived in Cuernavaca in 1529 and founded their 5th monastery in New Spain there. This first group included Martín de Lua, Francisco Martínez, Luis Ortiz, Juan de Cervo, Francisco de Soto, Andrés de Córdova, Martín de Jesús, Juan Juárez, Juan de Motolinía, and Juan García de Cervo. Originally they lived at the San Francisquito hermitage, but later they constructed the open-air chapel, Capilla Abierta, at what was to become a monastery and eventually the Cuernavaca Cathedral. They extended their presence into the neighboring communities of Tetecala, Jiutepec, and Tlaquiltenango, among others, eventually forming the province of Santo Evangelio, which would be part of the province of Mexico in 1543.

In 1646, this province was reorganized several times. Cuernavaca and Cuautla became high mayorships which answered directly to the viceregal authorities in Mexico City. In 1786, New Spain was divided into twelve provinces and in 1824, Cuernavaca was initially a district of Mexico City.

=== Independence to Revolution ===
During the Mexican War of Independence, José María Morelos was imprisoned at the Palacio de Cortés in November 1815. Agustín de Iturbide's army passed through Cuernavaca to fight Vicente Guerrero in 1820 and came through again in 1821, as the head of the Ejército Trigarante. After Independence and with the Constitution of 1824, the territory now known as the State of Morelos became part of the State of Mexico. Between 1827 and 1829, Cuernavaca was a district of this state. From 1829 to 1833, it was called a prefecture. In 1833, the State of Mexico declared the Atlacomulco Hacienda, which contains the Palacio de Cortés and Cortés's houses in Coyoacán, to be public property.

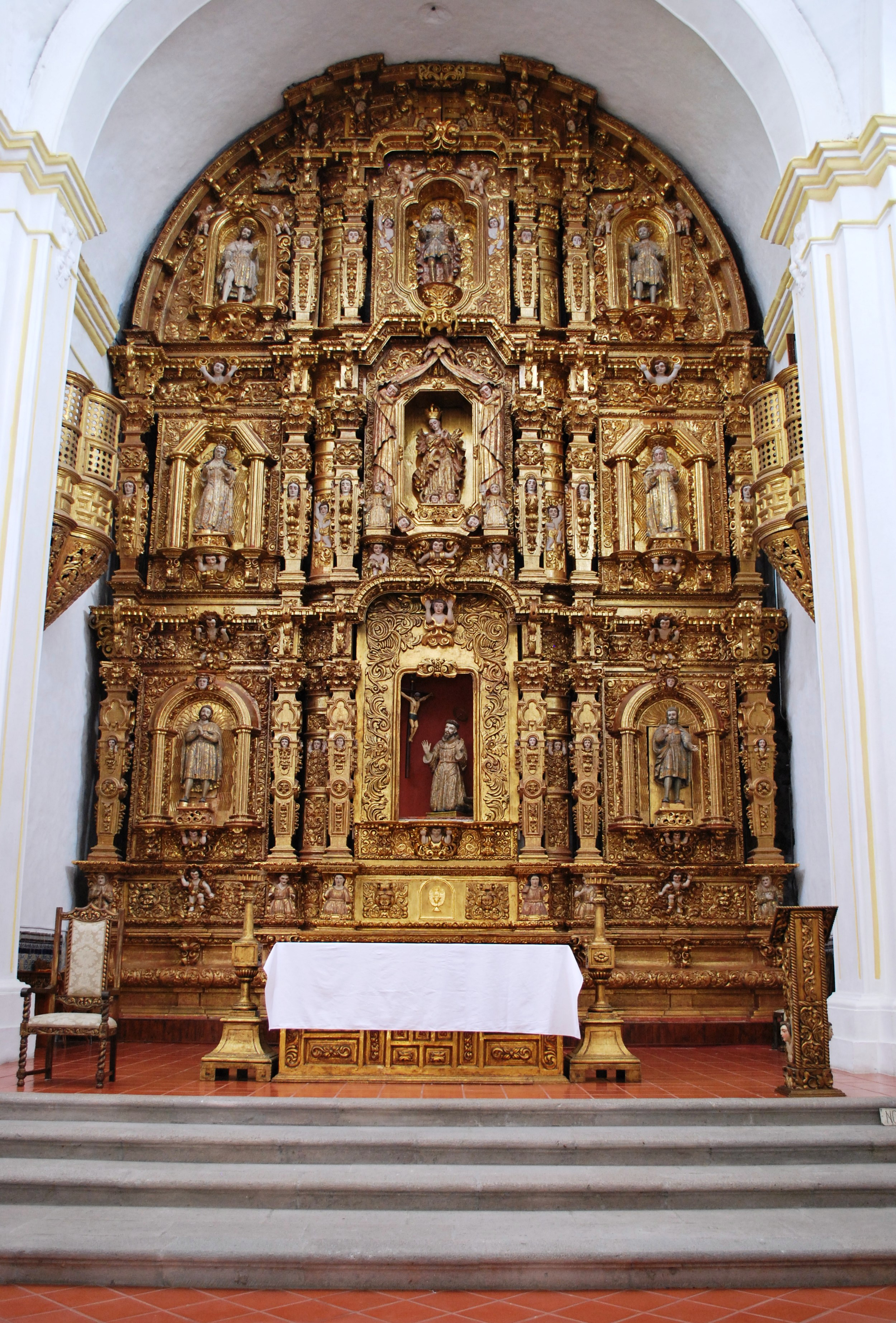
Main altar of the Chapel of The Third Order of Saint Francis

In 1834, Ignacio Echevarría and José María Tornel drafted the Plan of Cuernavaca, which permitted Antonio López de Santa Anna to disregard the laws protecting church property, exile Valentín Gómez Farías, reopen the university, and dissolve the tribunal that was set to convict Anastasio Bustamante for the assassination of Vicente Guerrero. In the same year, the State of Mexico declared Cuernavaca to be a city.

During the Mexican–American War (1846-1847), Cuernavaca was captured by the Cadwalader Brigade and was forced to pay retributions to the U.S. Army after the Cuernavaca Infantry under Francisco Modesto Olabuibel fell.

During the Ayutla Rebellion in 1854, Santa Anna was forced out of the capital of Mexico City in 1855. He moved his government to Cuernavaca, reorganized it, and named a junta to elect an interim president. This junta consisted of Valentín Gómez Farías, Melchor Ocampo, Benito Juárez, Francisco de P. Zendejas, Diego Álvarez, and Joaquín Moreno. They then voted for Alvarez as president. This new president swore to uphold the Plan of Ayutla and his inauguration was celebrated with much pomp in the city. Ministers from Guatemala, the United States, and Great Britain, as well as the Apostolic Delegate and the Consuls of Belgium, Chile, and some Asian countries, moved to Cuernavaca and recognized the Álvarez government.

In 1853, the District of Cuernavaca and the District of Mexico were declared separate.

During the Reform War (1857–1860) when conservatives rejected the liberal constitution of 1857, Juan Vicario voiced the cry of "Religión y Fueros" (Religion and Immunity) in Cuernavaca on 13 January 1858. In 1861, the Government of the State of Mexico created the districts of Cuernavaca, Jonacatepec, Tautepec, and Tetecala.

In order to facilitate operations against the French during the French Intervention, President Juarez divided the State of Mexico into three military districts. The third consisted of the territories of Cuernavaca, Yautepec, and Tetecala, with its capital in the city of Cuernavaca. Soon thereafter, this district fell into French hands. Maximilian I converted the Borda Garden into his summer residence and bought land in nearby Acapantzingo to construct a chalet. This prompted the construction of the Mexico-Cuernavaca highway.

When the French-installed monarch fell in 1867, Republican forces under Francisco Leyva, Ignacio Figueroa, and Ignacio Manuel Altamirano laid siege to Cuernavaca, which was defended by General Joaquín Ayestarán. The attackers cut off water supplies to the city and attacked on 3 January, but were met with a long series of street battles throughout the city. During the fighting, the general was killed and the Republican forces withdrew, victorious, to Mexico City, but only after burning a large portion of the city.

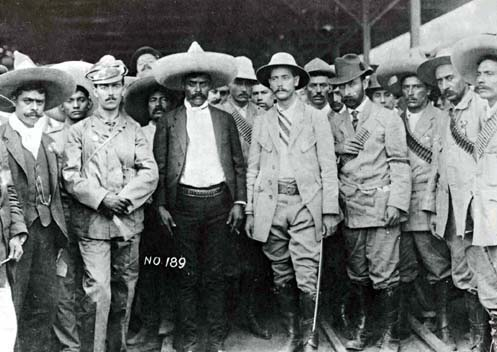
Emiliano Zapata in Cuernavaca

The State of Morelos was created in April 1869, with General Francisco Leyva as its first governor. Cuernavaca was declared the capital of the new state in November of the same year. In 1877, under Governor Carlos Pacheco, the Toluca-Cuernavaca highway was built and a rail connection created between Cuernavaca and Mexico City. The Porfirio Díaz Theater was opened in February 1882, and the first Public Health Board in the city was established the same year. In 1891, the Diocese of Cuernavaca was established by Pope Leo XII, comprising the entire state of Morelos, with Hipolito Vera as the first bishop of Cuernavaca. The first locomotive arrived on 1 December 1897, and a bridge was constructed to connect the center of the city with the train station. The Bank of Morelos was founded in 1903.

=== Mexican Revolution and 20th century ===
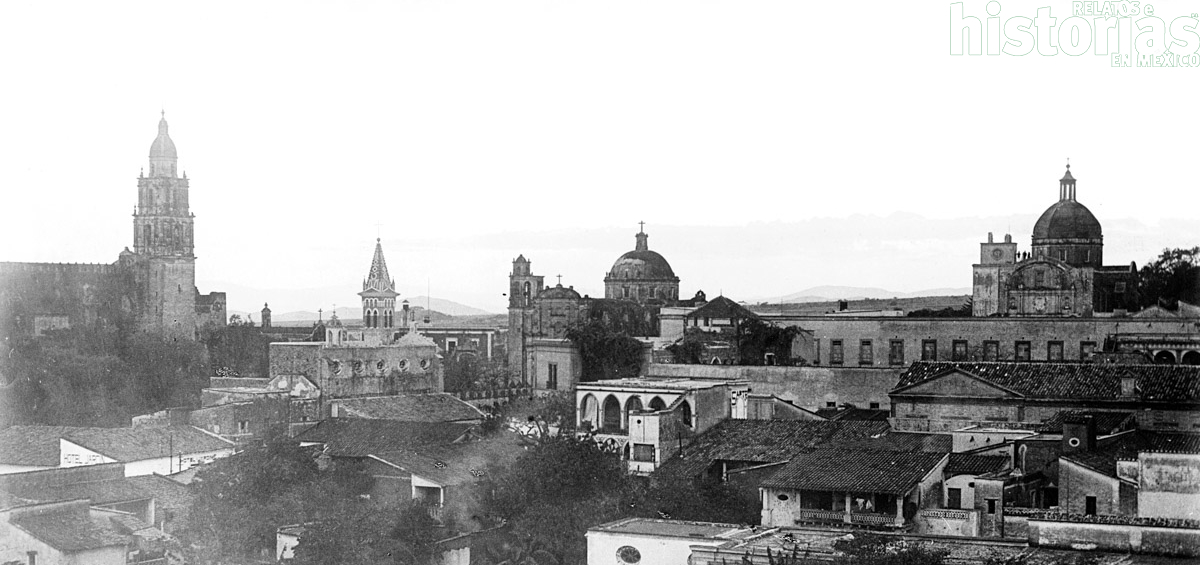
Cuernavaca in 1893. Library of US Congress.

In 1909, the anti-reelection movement was established in Cuernavaca, and by the end of this same year guerilla operations against the Diaz government were headed by Genovevo de la O in Santa María Ahuacatitlán. Emiliano Zapata took over the movement in the south and named De la O in charge of the Cuernavaca area. On 21 May 1911, Cuernavaca was evacuated by government troops, leaving the entire state in rebel hands. Professor Brunk, describing Zapata's triumph, writes "On the twenty-sixth, at 4 o'clock on a bright Friday afternoon, Zapata rode triumphantly into that city at the head of four thousand troops. Waving images of the Virgin of Guadalupe overhead, these revolutionaries were a ragged lot in the eyes of the urbane. But to the throngs who greeted them - the common people of Morelos, the young girls with armfuls of bougainvillea - they were conquering heroes." President Francisco I. Madero visited the city on 12 June 1911, and he attended a banquet in the Borda Garden. The city later fell to the forces of Huerta, and Zapata began to lay siege to Cuernavaca in May 1914 with 3,600 men, falling by August. Later, on 26 January 1915, the Revolutionary government was moved to the city, in defiance of Carranza and the Constitutionalists. However, Zapata lost control of Cuernavaca on 2 May 1916 and was forced to return to guerilla warfare.

The Spanish flu came to Cuernavaca in 1918, leaving only 3,000 survivors, although by May 1920 it had a population of 12,799.

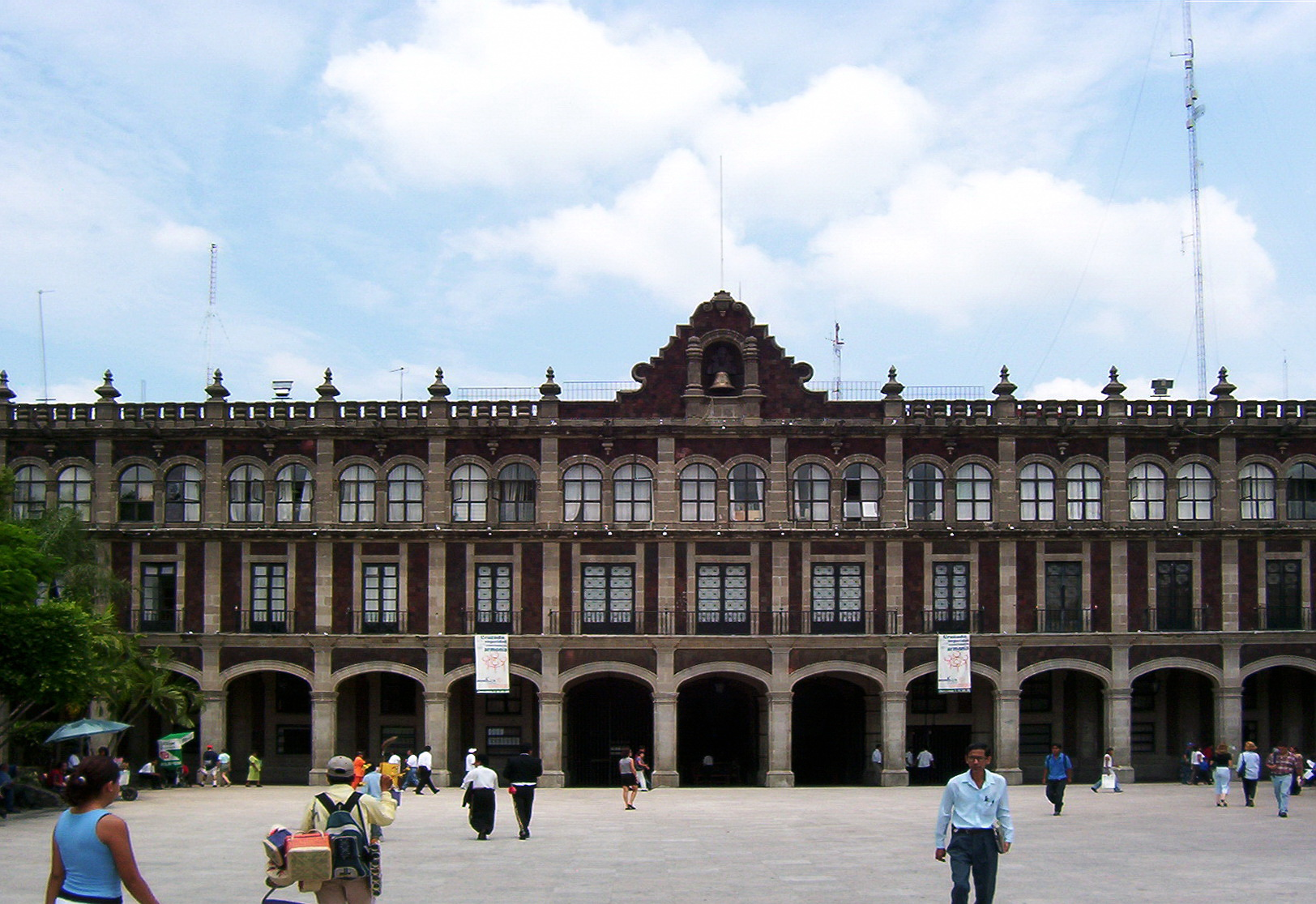
The Head Government Building of Cuernavaca

Wealthy North Americans and Europeans established secondary residences in Cuernavaca and took long vacations there or frequently traveled back and forth, while servants maintained the haciendas in their absence. Sometimes, their offspring have made Cuernavaca their permanent residence, creating an enclave of natives with international roots bearing the influence of their cultures. For example, when the American designer, Michael van Beuren fled Germany with members of Bauhaus, where he was practicing his profession, he took up residence at the vacation hacienda of his parents in Cuernavaca, and stayed permanently, establishing his factory nearby and raising his family there. Others in his family began to reside there year 'round. Their children were natives of Mexico. Video on YouTube

After his installation as U.S. Ambassador to Mexico in 1927, American businessman Dwight Morrow established a weekend home in Cuernavaca on the street that today bears his name. It was here that his daughter Anne met famed aviator Charles Lindbergh, whom Morrow had invited to Mexico. In celebration of his daughter's engagement to Lindbergh and to thank the people of Cuernavaca, in 1929 Morrow commissioned Diego Rivera to paint the mural "History of Morelos, Conquest and Revolution" at the Palacio de Cortes.

During the 1920s and 1930s, Cuernavaca became a place to vacation and gamble when the Hotel de la Selva was converted into the Casino de la Selva, which attracted people such as Rita Hayworth, Bugsy Siegel, and Al Capone to Cuernavaca, however, gambling was shut down by Lázaro Cárdenas in 1934. He is the same president who declared the area a ZPG (Forest Protection Zone). The casino hosted very important artistic works, including murals of Alvarez Icaza, Messeguer, and the architecture of Candela. The main vault was considered to be the "Mexican Sistine Chapel" by Nobel Prize author, Gabriel García Márquez.

1936 was the year that Malcolm Lowry wrote his short story, "Under The Volcano", which inspired his 1947 novel of the same name. It has never gone out of print and was made into a movie in 1984. Cuernavaca, or Quaunahuac, as it is called in the novel, and the surrounding area, figure prominently in this great historical novel, where extensive details on Mexican history, culture, topography, and especially, politics and religion figure prominently. The recurrent artifacts are the twin volcanos, Popocatepetl and Iztaccihuatl, and the barranca, symbols of division, death, and rebirth in the city of eternal spring.

Dr. Sergio Méndez Arceo became bishop of Cuernavaca in 1952. Mendez was known as a leading voice of Liberation Theology and he was a human rights activist.

In 1956, Erich Fromm founded the Sociedad Mexicana de Psicoanálisis and from his house in Cuernavaca promoted new ideas in the field of psychiatry, incorporating Zen Buddhism and "communal psychoanalytic studies" (estudios psicoanalíticos comunitarios). This attracted many artists, composers, architects, and counterculture types here. In the 1960s, the city was one of the centers of the psychedelic movement. Timothy Leary tried psilocybin mushrooms there in the summer of 1960 and came back regularly to repeat the experience.

There was a riot in Cuernavaca in February 1957 after a police officer shot and killed Jorge Garrigós.

In 1966, Austrian priest Ivan Illich founded the Centro Intercultural de Documentación (CIDOC) to teach Spanish language and culture to North American missionaries. This center was closed by order of the Vatican in 1969, but several of the teachers continued elsewhere in the city, making Cuernavaca a leading center of Spanish-language teaching for foreigners.

More recently the city has seen a very active society dedicated to the preservation of its environment and cultural heritage. The Frente Civico which is now influential throughout the country, along with some 150 other organizations has promoted a boycott against Costco for having destroyed the Casino de la Selva to build a couple of warehouses. One of its members, Professor Jaime Lagunez, lobbied a general agreement in the national congress for the purpose of protecting its sixty archeological sites, its vegetation, historic center, and neighboring forests, among other important cultural aspects of the city. The Frente Civico received the 2004 National Mendez Arceo Human Rights Award for having protected the world cultural heritage found in the city.

=== 21st century ===
The 19 September 2017 earthquake with a magnitude of 7.1 killed four people and damaged or destroyed 180 homes, 11 churches, and 10 other Cuernavaca buildings, including the Cortés Palace, the cathedral, and the landmark Torre Latinoamericana, according to Fernando Manrique Rivas, general director of Protección Civil de Cuernavaca.

Cuernavaca instituted a curfew and possible arrest for 36 hours for violators during the COVID-19 pandemic in Mexico. Open-air restaurants and bars were closed. Mayor Antonio Villalobos Adan commented on 1 May that the city needs a new cemetery with capacity for 15,000 people, since the city's seven cemeteries are all saturated. It is already estimated that 40% of the population in the Antonio Barona neighborhood has been contaminated by COVID-19. On 2 June, Cuernavaca reported 393 confirmed cases and 83 deaths from the virus; the reopening of the state was pushed back until at least 13 June. Cuernavaca reported 1,322 cases, 1,015 recoveries, and 223 deaths on 31 August. 2,566 cases were reported on 27 December 2020.

Four bottles of the Pfizer–BioNTech COVID-19 vaccine were stolen from "Carlos Calero Elorduy Hospital" run by SEDENA on 14 January. This hospital plus the G. Parres general hospital, both dedicated to the care of serious COVID-19 cases, reached 100% capacity on 15 January 2021.

== Points of interest ==
=== Palace of Cortés ===
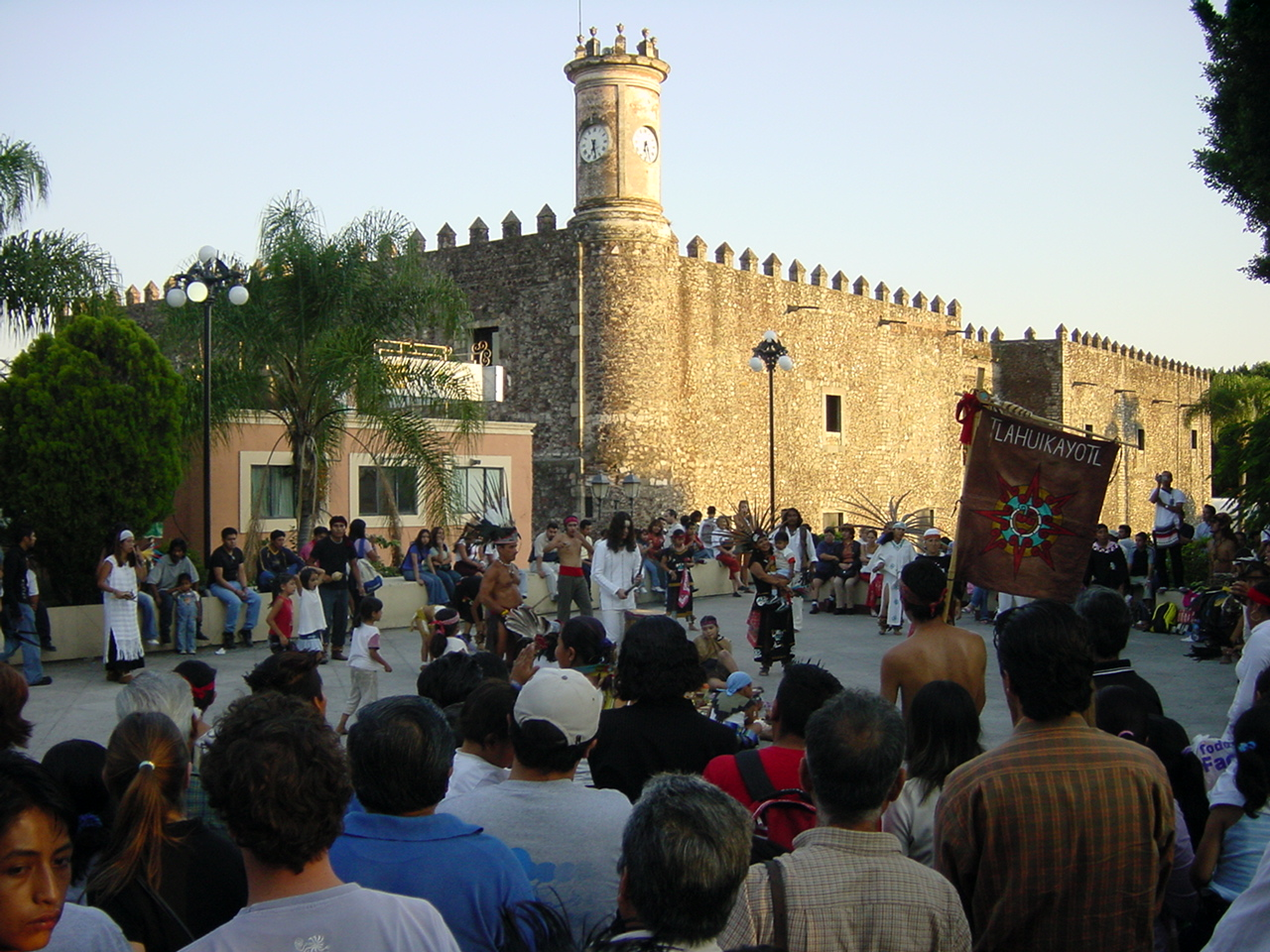
Palacio de Cortés seen from the zocalo of Cuernavaca

The Palacio de Cortés is east of the Morelos Garden and is considered to be the most representative building of Cuernavaca. Built by Hernán Cortés, it was finished in 1535. It is one of the oldest European-style, civil constructions in the Americas, but is executed in Renaissance style. The series of arches of the central terrace, the battlements, and the thick walls are the most representative aspects of the original construction. It is said that this residence looks much like the mansion built in Santo Domingo by Diego Colón, the son of Christopher Columbus. Just outside the front of the building is an old pyramid base over which Cortés had the structure built, on a hill that dominated the old city. Petroglyphs recovered from the site and from throughout the city are on display. From right to left the petroglyphs are named Lagarto de San Antón, Aguila de Chapultepec, Piedra Chimalli, or Piedra de los Encantos.

After having been the residence of Cortés and his descendants for several centuries, the building became a warehouse, a jail, a military barracks, and then the State Government Palace (until 1969). From 1971 to 1973, the building was restored extensively and today houses the Museo Regional Cuauhnáhuac, dedicated to the history of Morelos State. It often is referred to as "the Palacio of Cortes". It has ten exhibit halls with maps, illustrations, photographs, works of art, and everyday items from various epochs representing the first human settlements in the state to the present day. It has murals created by Diego Rivera that reflect both Morelos and Mexican history. Adjacent to the Palacio a permanent local handicraft market in which one may purchase silver jewelry, T-shirts, beaded bracelets, pottery, hammocks, blankets, and much more.

=== Morelos and Juárez Gardens ===
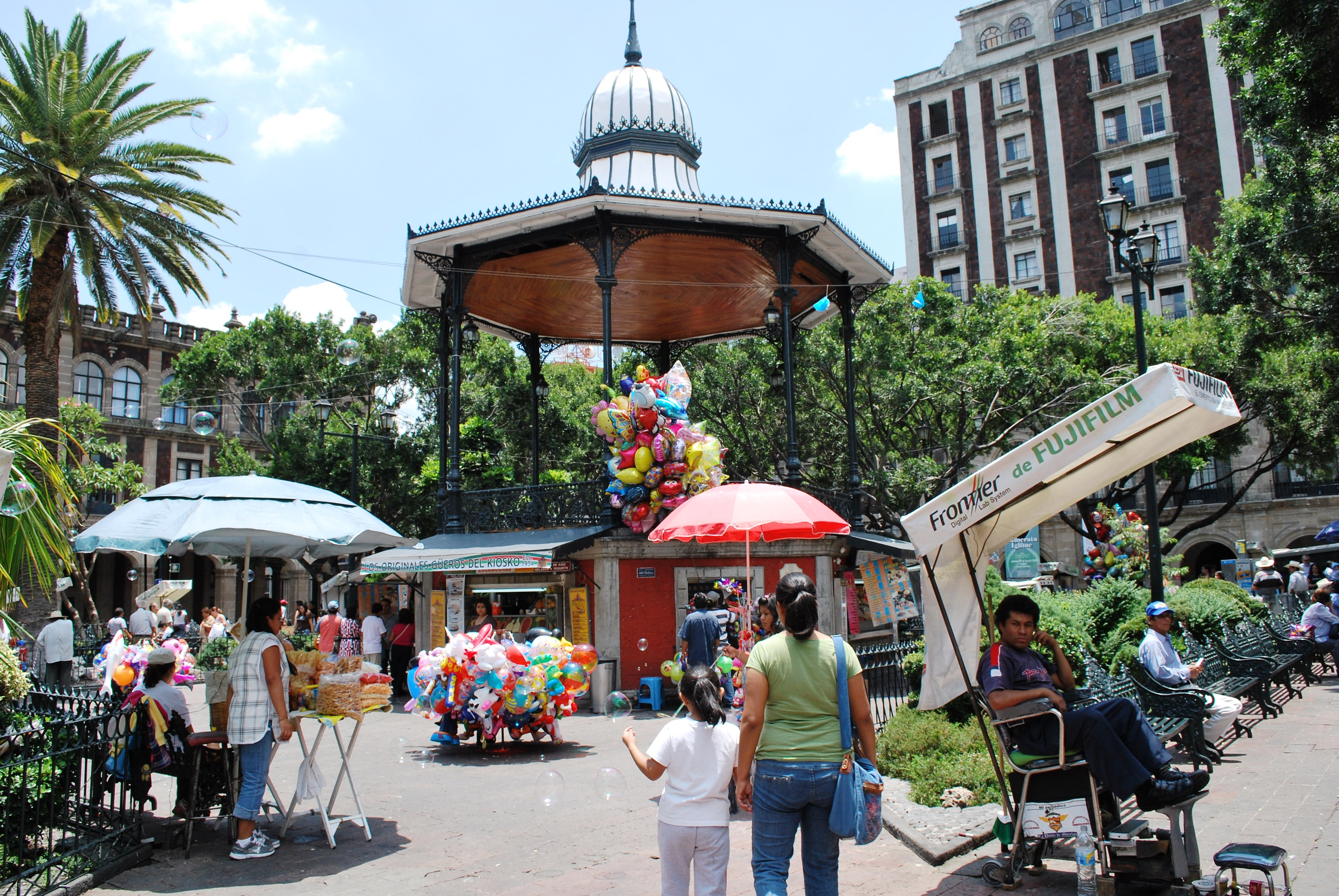
Juárez Garden

The Juárez and Morelos Gardens are in the center of the city, both of which are plazas lined with trees. Between the two is the State Government Palace, a three-story building with a tezontle façade built between 1955 and 1969. The Morelos Garden dates from 1908 and is easily recognizable by the large stone statue of José María Morelos, which is known colloquially as "Morelotes". The Juárez Garden is located to the north of the State Government Palace and is the oldest public square in Cuernavaca. The Garden contains a kiosk sometimes said to be designed by Gustave Eiffel and brought from Britain toward the end of the 19th century. Unlike most main squares in Mexico, neither of these open up the way to the main cathedral. The main cathedral in Cuernavaca is located a few blocks west of the square.

These two gardens or plazas are known colloquially as the "zócalo". Spectacles are often to be seen here and can include people dancing the "danzón" or other popular dances and "estudiantinas" dressed in colonial-era Spanish garb, playing instruments and dancing, and any number of free concerts. Often clowns perform on the zocalo as well, with balloons and tricks for the children and tell double-entendre jokes for the adults. Locals use the plazas to sell products such as honey, yogurt, traditional candies, and crafts. Street food such as corn on the cob, snow cones, candies, fruit smoothies, and more generally are available.

=== Cathedral ===
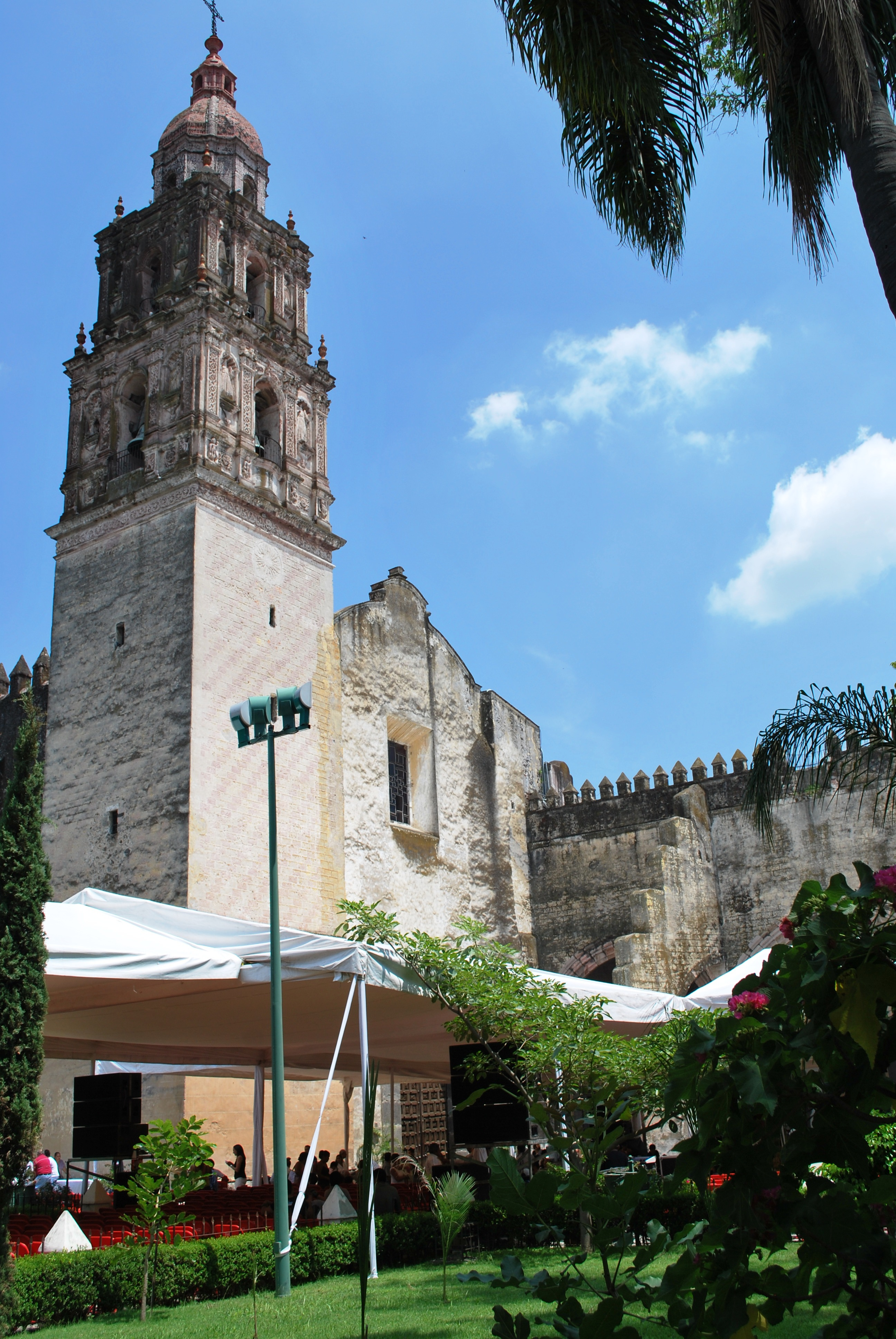
Facade of Cathedral

Cuernavaca Cathedral is the main church of what was the monastery of the Third Order of the Franciscans, called La Asunción, that dates back to the 16th century. It sits on the southeast corner of a large atrium, which also contains a number of other chapels that were built at different times and with different architectural styles. This complex is located at the intersection of Hidalgo and Morelos streets, a few blocks west of the town center.

The cathedral was built by Cortés to double as a fortress, with cannons mounted above the buttresses. Over time, this church underwent a number of transformations, updating its interior. This was undone in the mid-20th century, when restoration work removed all the Neoclassical altars and images. These now are stored in the cathedral's pinacotheca and not available to the public. Restoration work uncovered al fresco murals on the lateral walls, relating to the martyrdom of Philip of Jesus, the first Mexican canonized as a saint. The only other decoration inside this church now is a modern-style crucifix and an image of the Assumption of Mary. This restoration work was carried out by Bishop Sergio Méndez Arceo.

After the Reform Laws in the 1860s, most of the monastery property passed into state, then private hands, leaving only what is now the cathedral and several smaller chapels on a very large atrium. The Revolution Garden was the orchard of the Cathedral, and the cloister with its observatory, is now the Robert Brady Museum. The church became the Cathedral of Cuernavaca in 1891.

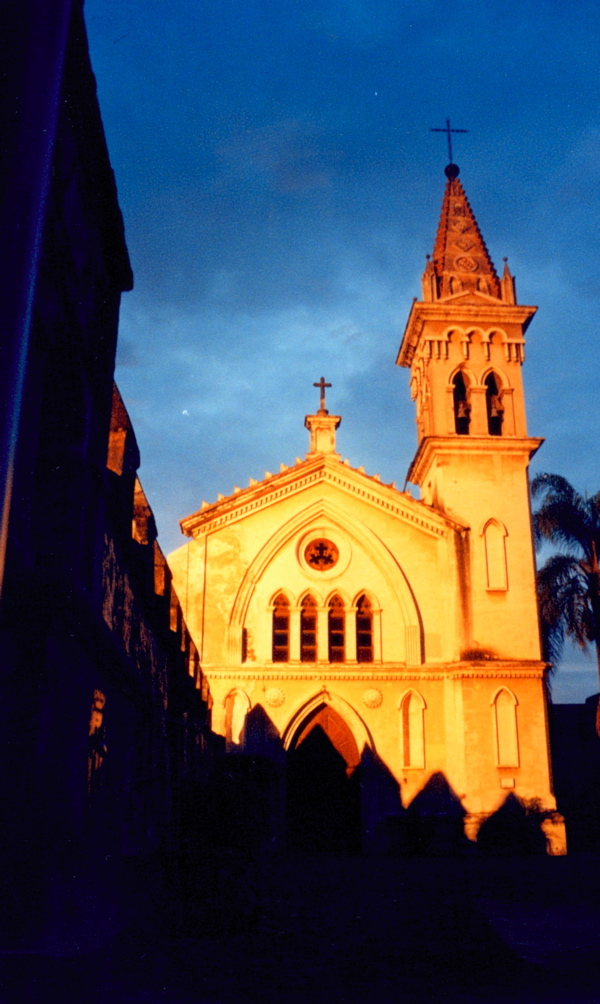
Cathedral's side-chapel at sunset

Next to the cathedral is the "open chapel" (capilla abierta) of San José, which is an original structure built in the 16th century. It also was rescued and restored by Bishop Méndez Arceo and is one of the oldest constructions on the site. The building consists of a vault with three arches that face the atrium. These arches are supported by a pair of flying buttresses. Inside the arches is an altarpiece dating from the 17th century.

The main entrance is on Hidalgo Street, where one passes between two large chapels called the Chapel of Santa Cruz and the Chapel of the Tercera Orden. The Tercera Orden is considered to be the more valuable artistically of the two, with its highly sculpted early Baroque main and side portals painted in various colors. Inside, there is a later Churrigueresque main altar. A third chapel, called the Chapel of Nuestra Señora de los Dolores is farther into the atrium and near the Open Chapel of San José. The bell tower was added in 1713. The cathedral was damaged during the September 2017 earthquake, but it has since been restored.

==== Other churches of interest ====
- Parish of Nuestra Señora de Guadalupe (El Sagrario) was built as a family chapel by Manuel de la Borda in the 18th century. The façade is Baroque, but it has greatly deteriorated in recent years due to acid rain. The cupola is particularly noteworthy.
- Parish of Los Tres Reyes Magos in Tetela was built in the 16th century by Franciscan monks. It is Baroque style, and there is a fresco inside painted by Marcos Aldaña. The stone fence around the perimeter of the church was designed by British sculptor John Spencer in the 1980s.
- El Calvario refers to two buildings just north of the Historic Center of Cuernavaca. The smaller is a chapitel (open-air chapel) built in 1538 at what was then the entrance to the city. It gets its name from the cross on top. There is a fountain in front called Fuente de los Leones or Fuente de las Ranas. In 1772 the chapitel was dedicated to the Virgin of Guadalupe, and there is a large fair every 12 December. The larger building is the church of San Jose, built in 1939.
- The Church of Tepetates, built in the 16th century at the time of the conquest of Cuauhnáhuac, was named after the type of soil found in the area. It is located off Guerrero Street in the old district of Tecoac, which was one of the five neighborhoods that made up the center of the City of Cuernavaca. For years it was the symbol of the city due to its picturesque façade flanked by two cypresses. This temple is designed in neoclassic style, dedicated to Jesus of Nazareth. The church a small atrium, an open chapel, and a nave in addition to two bells that date from 1791. Fr. William Wasson founded the orphanage Nuestros Pequeños Hermanos here in 1954. It is believed the church was built upon a teocalli (Prehispanic temple).
- Santuario de Tlaltenango. Temple of San José is said to be the first church built in the American continent (1523) on the grounds of Hernán Cortés's hacienda. Next to this is the larger Sanctuary of Our Lady of Tlaltenango built in honor of the "Virgin of Miracles" in 1730. The largest belltower in Morelos was built in 1886. There is a large street fair every 8 September. A few blocks away is the Chapel of San Jerónimo, built during the second half of the 16th century, for the common people since masses in the Church of San José were officiated only for the wealthy.
- Parish of St. John the Apostle, built in the 18th century (Chapultepec). There is an image of el Señor de las Batallas, a representation of Christ as a soldier in honor of soldiers from the State of Morelos.
- Parish of San Luis Obispo (Amatitlan), built in the 17th century. The church is run by Franciscans.
- Parish of San Miguel Arcangel, built in the 18th century. (Acapantzingo)
- Church of San Nicolás Tolentino, built in the 16th century. (Ahuatepec). On the right side of the church there is a mausoleum with the remains of the revolutionary general Antonio Barona, companion of Emiliano Zapata, who was killed by rival general Genovevo de la O.
- Church of San Lorenzo Mártir, built in the 16th century. (Chamilpa)
- Church of El Divino Salvador a Baroque church built by Franciscans in the 16th century (Ocotepec). During the 1914 Siege of Cuernavaca, the people of the town donated the bells so they could be melted down and used as cannonballs. Just east of Ocotepec is the Benedictine monastery of Nuestra Señora de los Angeles designed by Gabriel Chávez de la Mora. The chapel is round and is used for Catholic retreats.

There are a number of non-Catholic churches in Cuernavaca also, notably the Episcopal Cathedral of San Miguel Arcángel located at the corner of Calles Guerrero and Santos, Centro Historico.

Landmarks and monuments of Cuernavaca

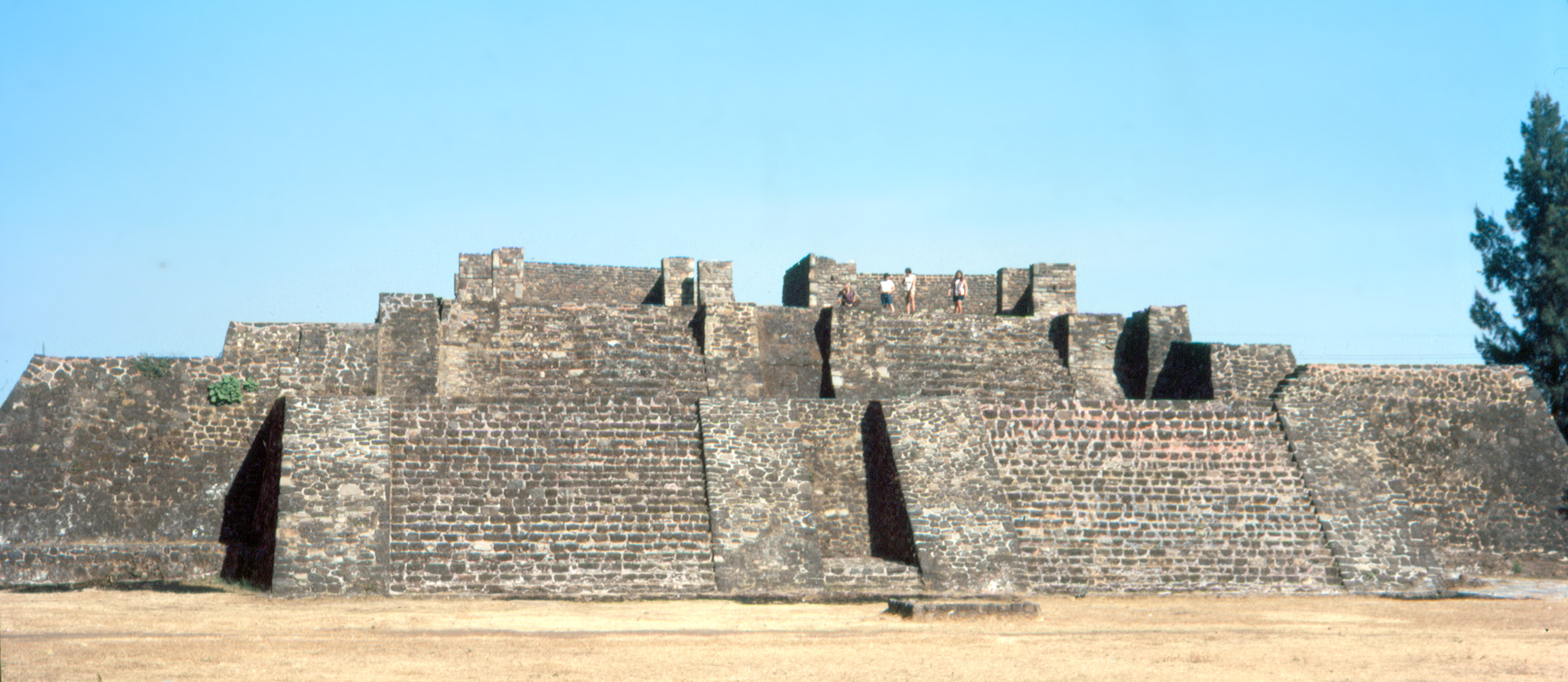
Teopanzolco, Aztec, date from the Middle to Late Postclassic Period (1300-1521)

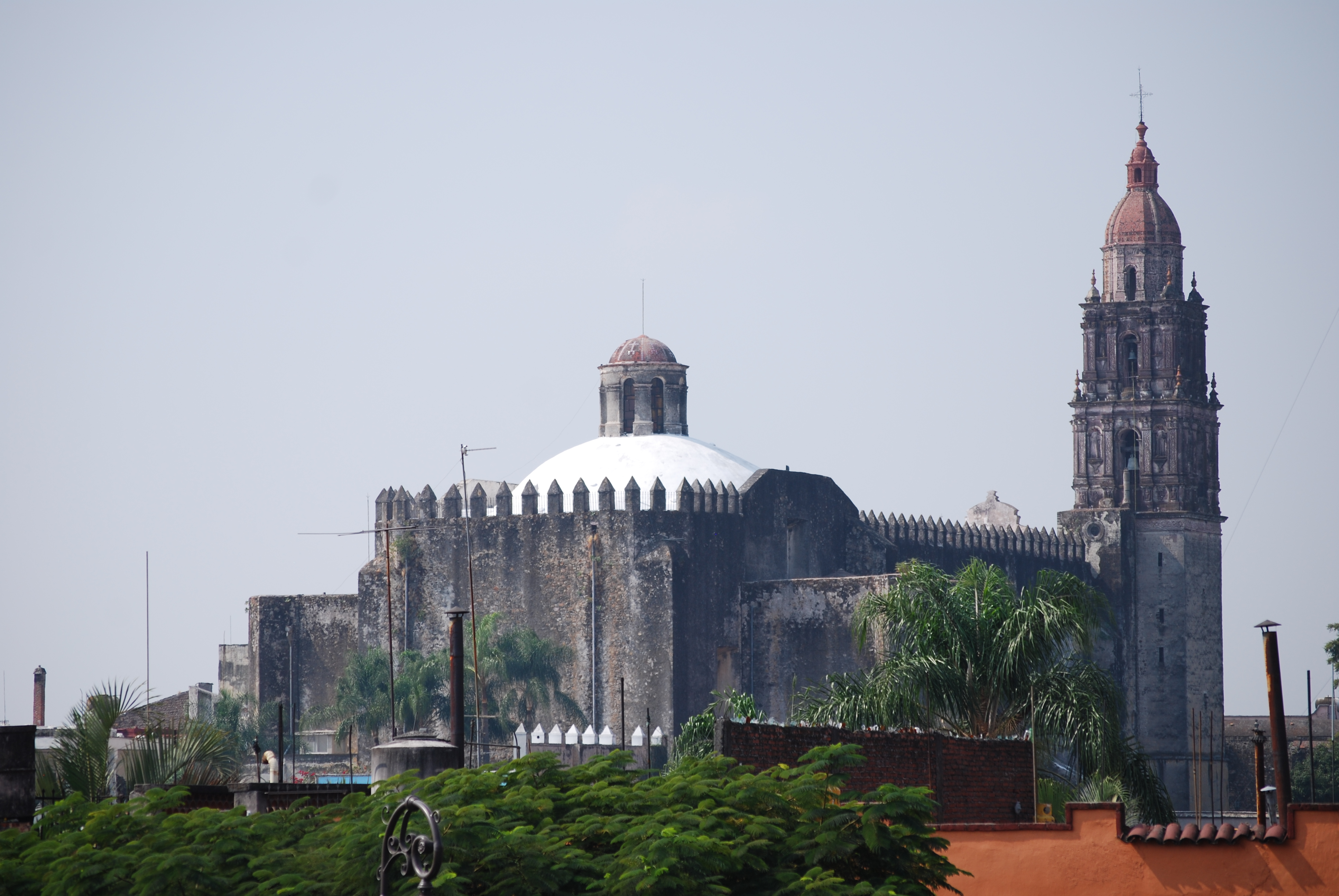
Cuernavaca Cathedral and Convent, built in 1529-late 17th century, by the Franciscans. A UNESCO WHS.

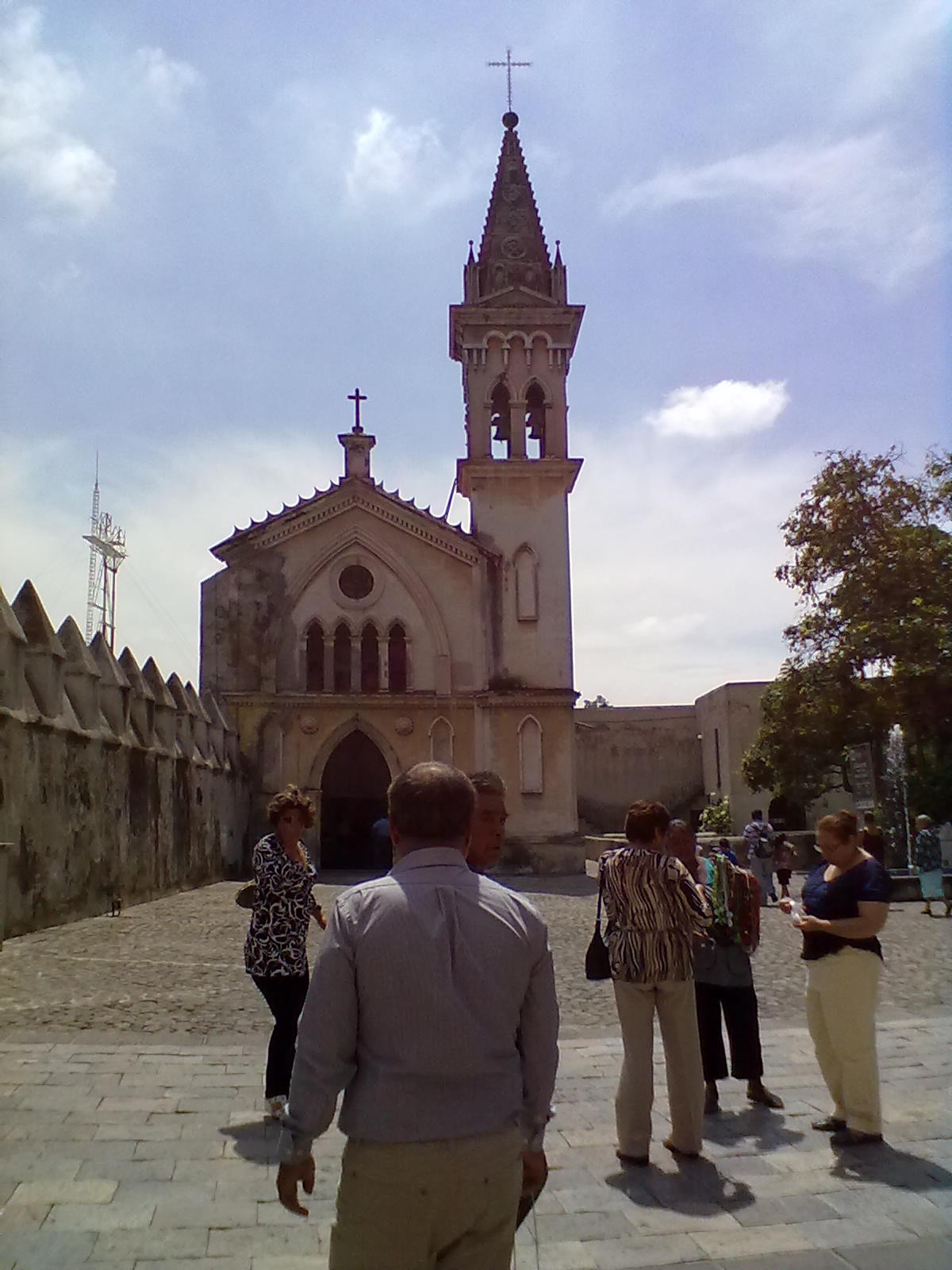
Chapel of Santa María, chapel of the Cuernavaca Cathedral

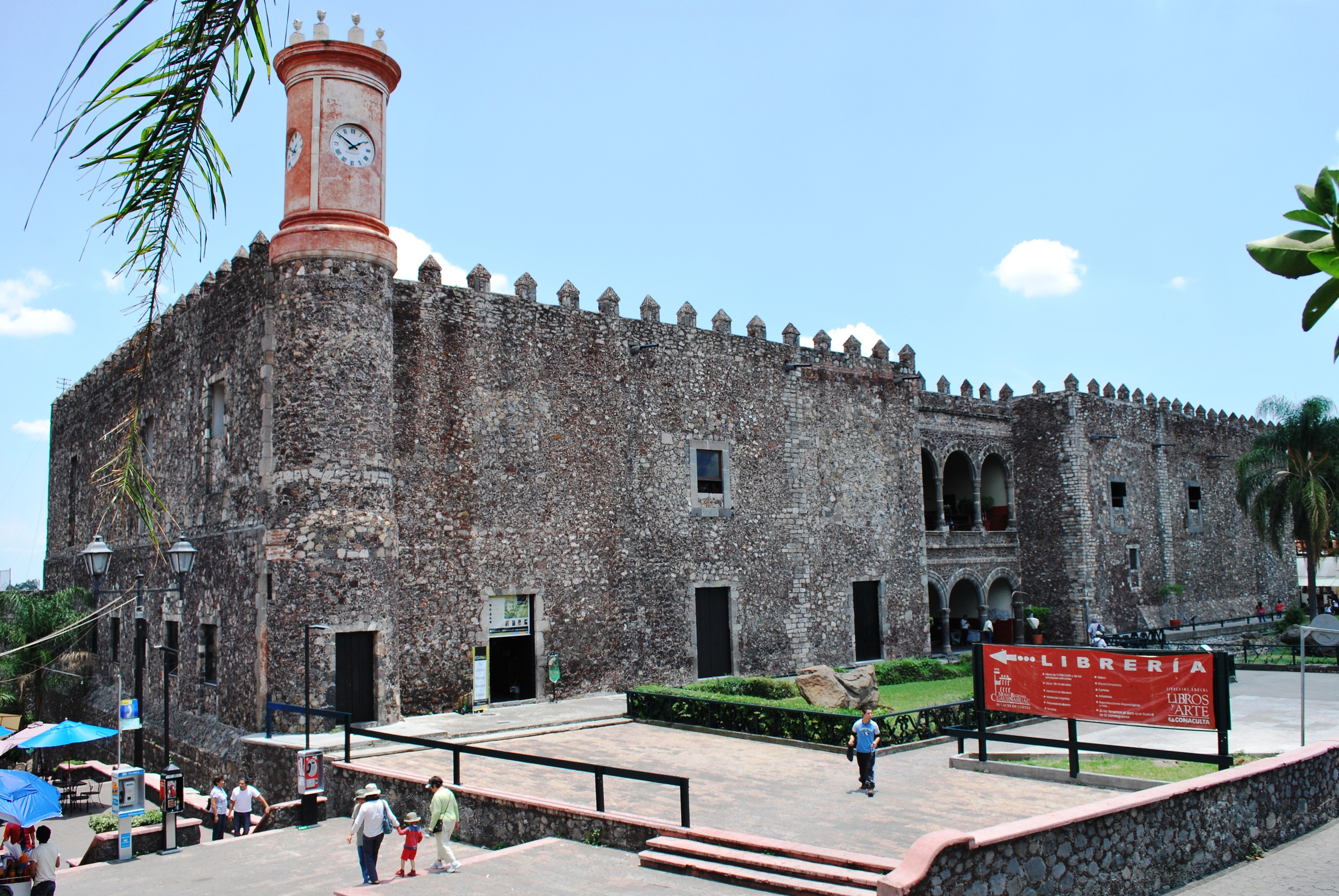
Palace of Cortés, built between 1523 and 1747 by Hernán Cortés and Gregorio Cayetano Durán.

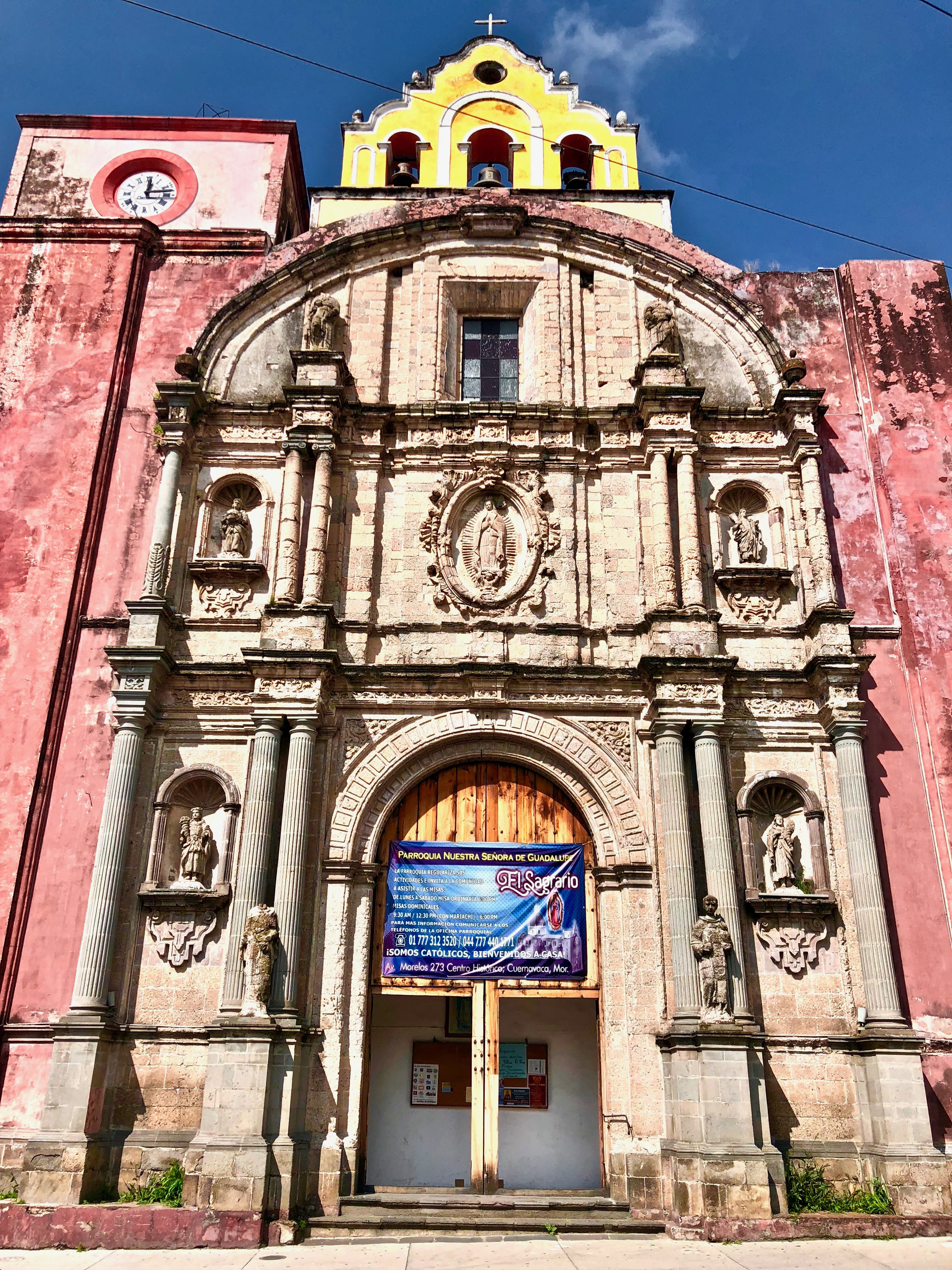
Church of Our Lady of Guadalupe, built in 1784.

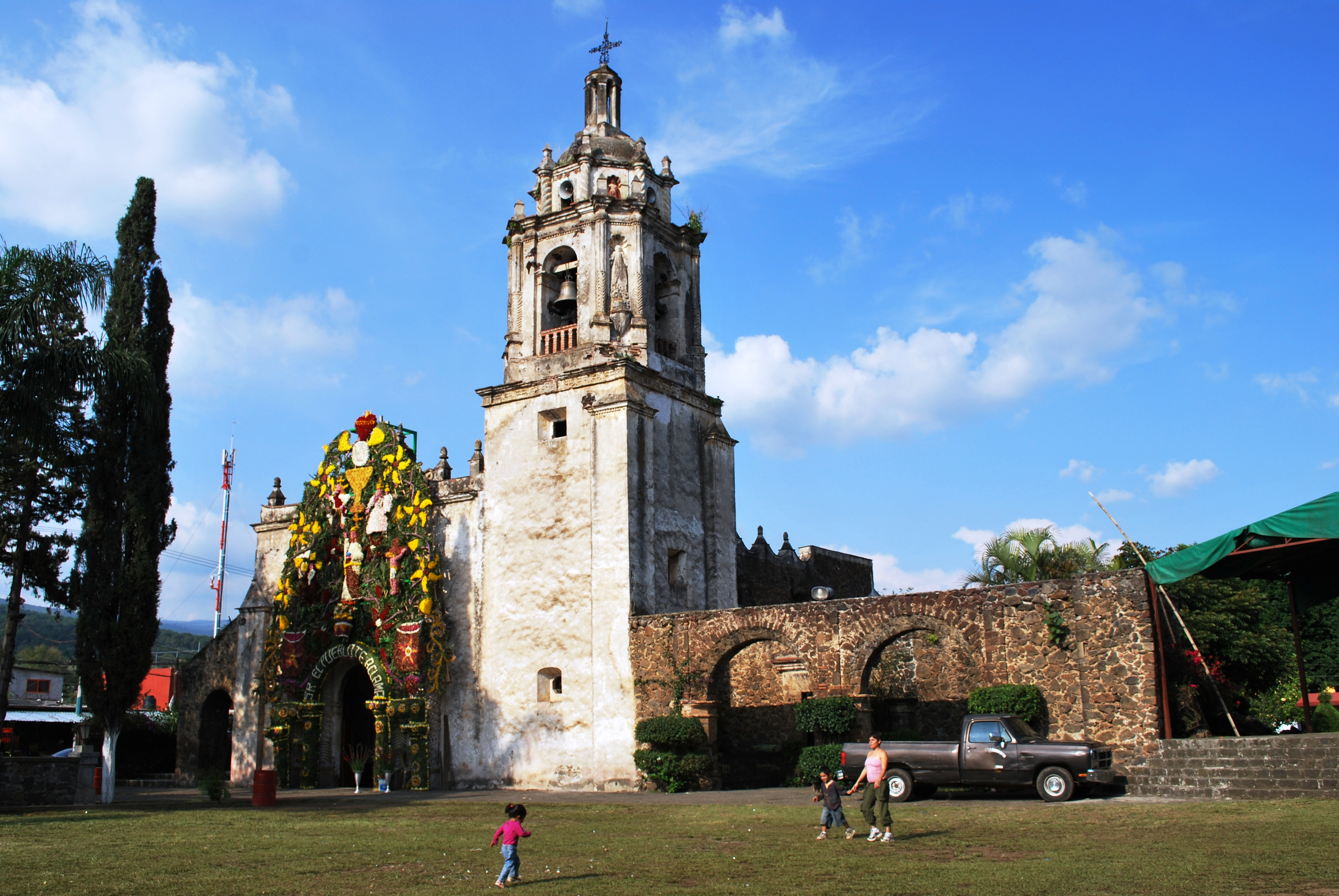
Parish El Divino Salvador de Ocotepec, built in 1530-1592 by the Franciscans friars.

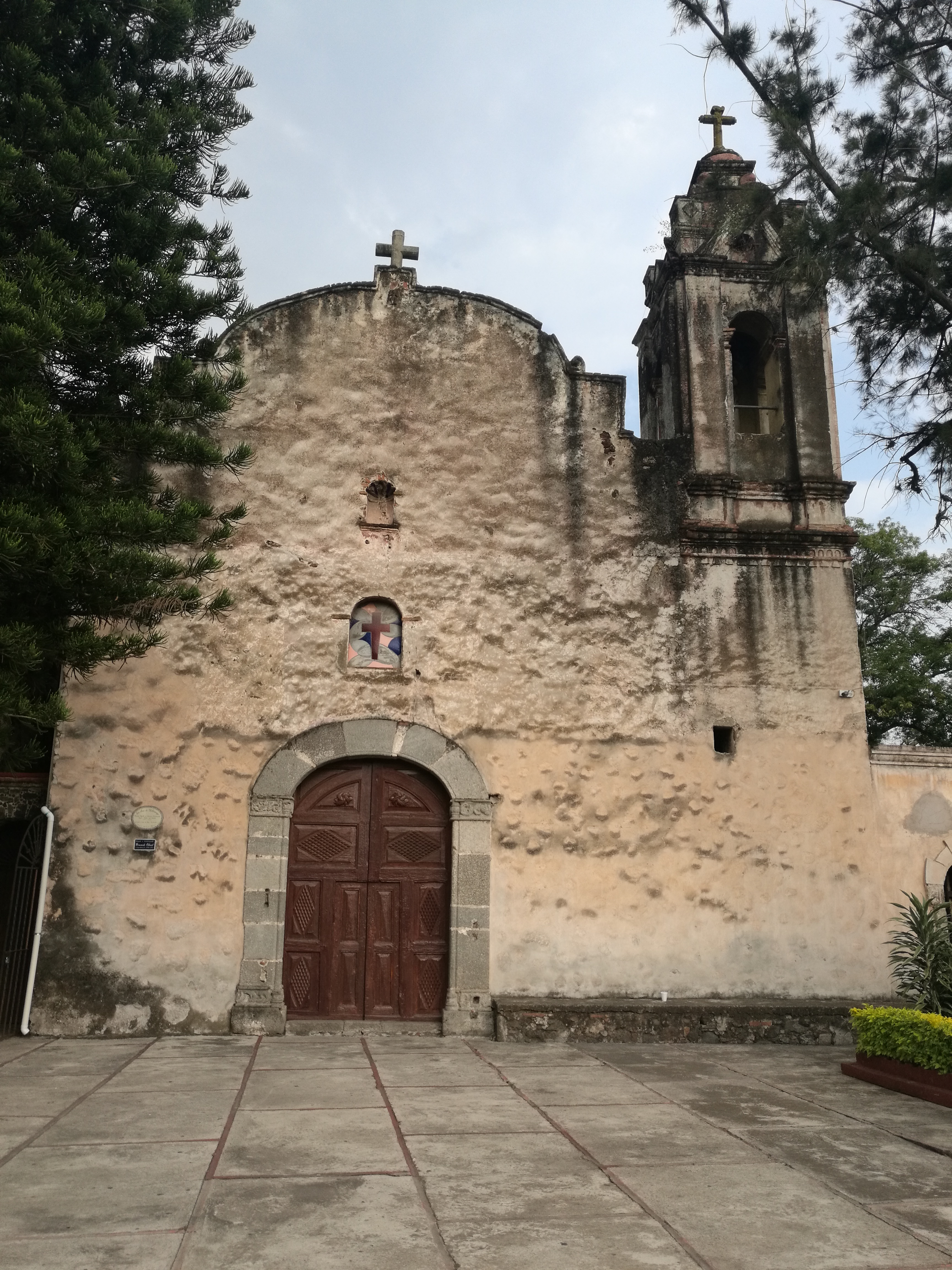
Chapel of San José Tlaltenango, built in 1523.

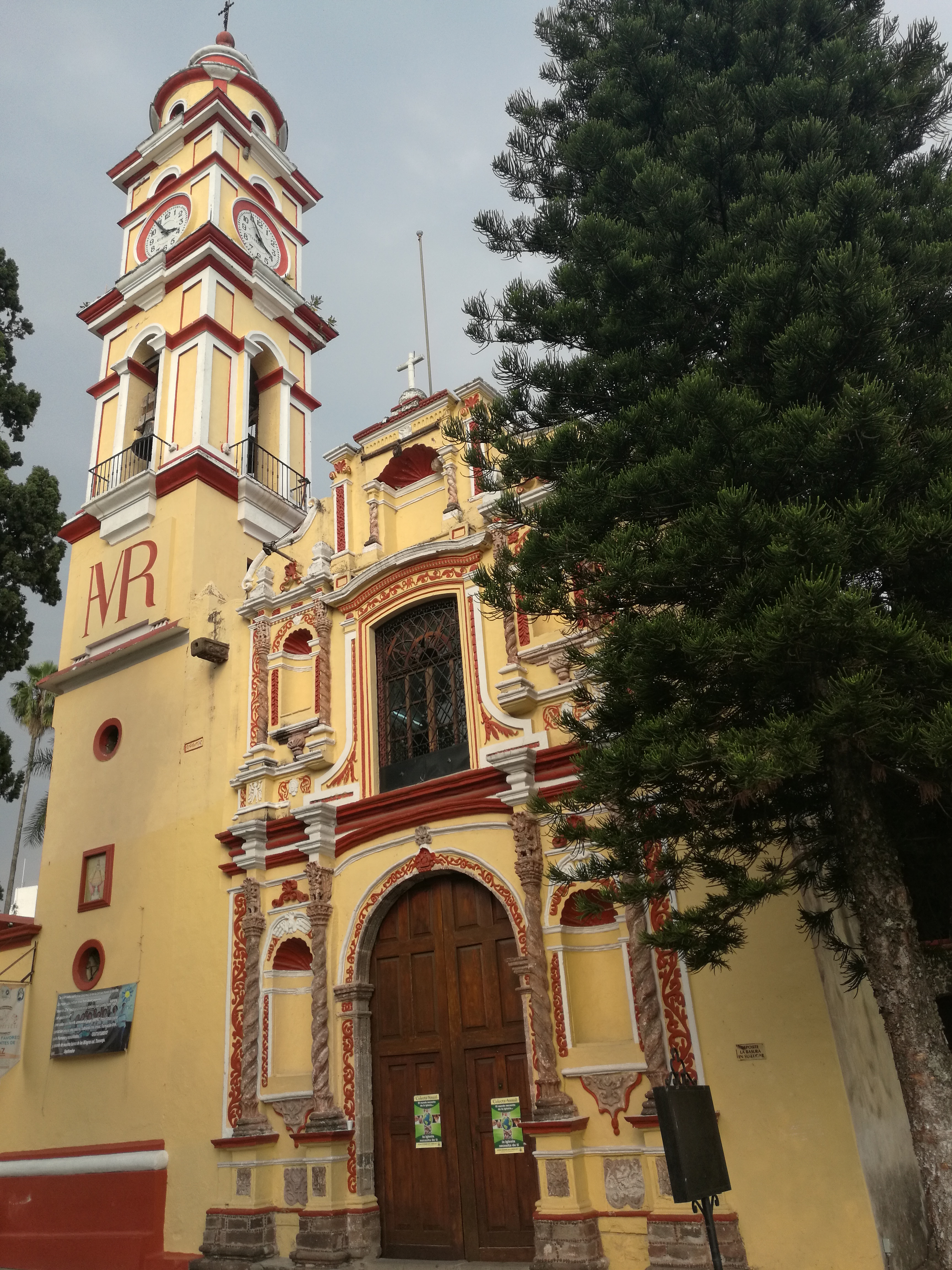
Sanctuary of Nuestra Señora de los Milagros de Tlaltenango, built in 1720-1730.

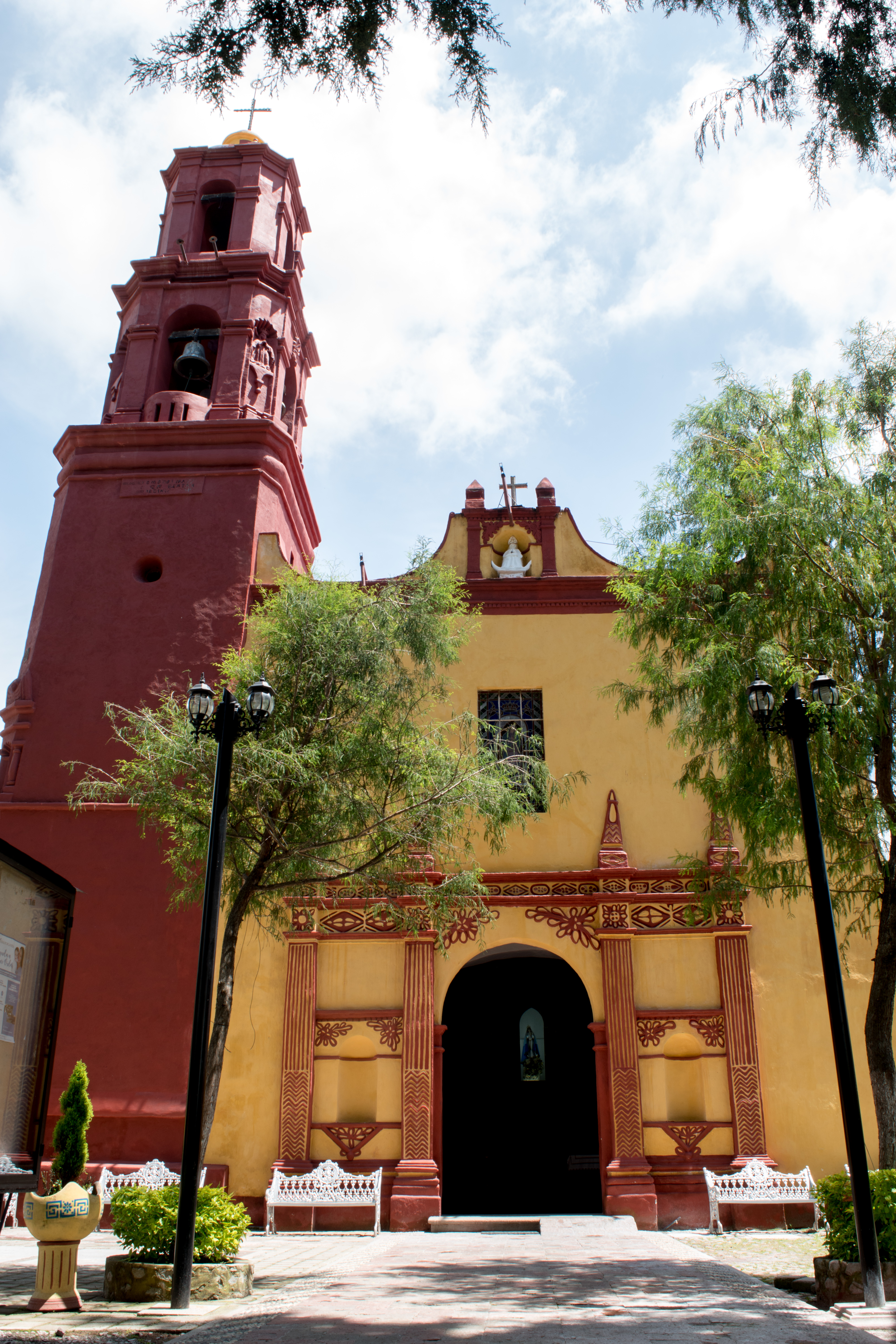
Asunción de María y San José Parish, built in the 16th century.

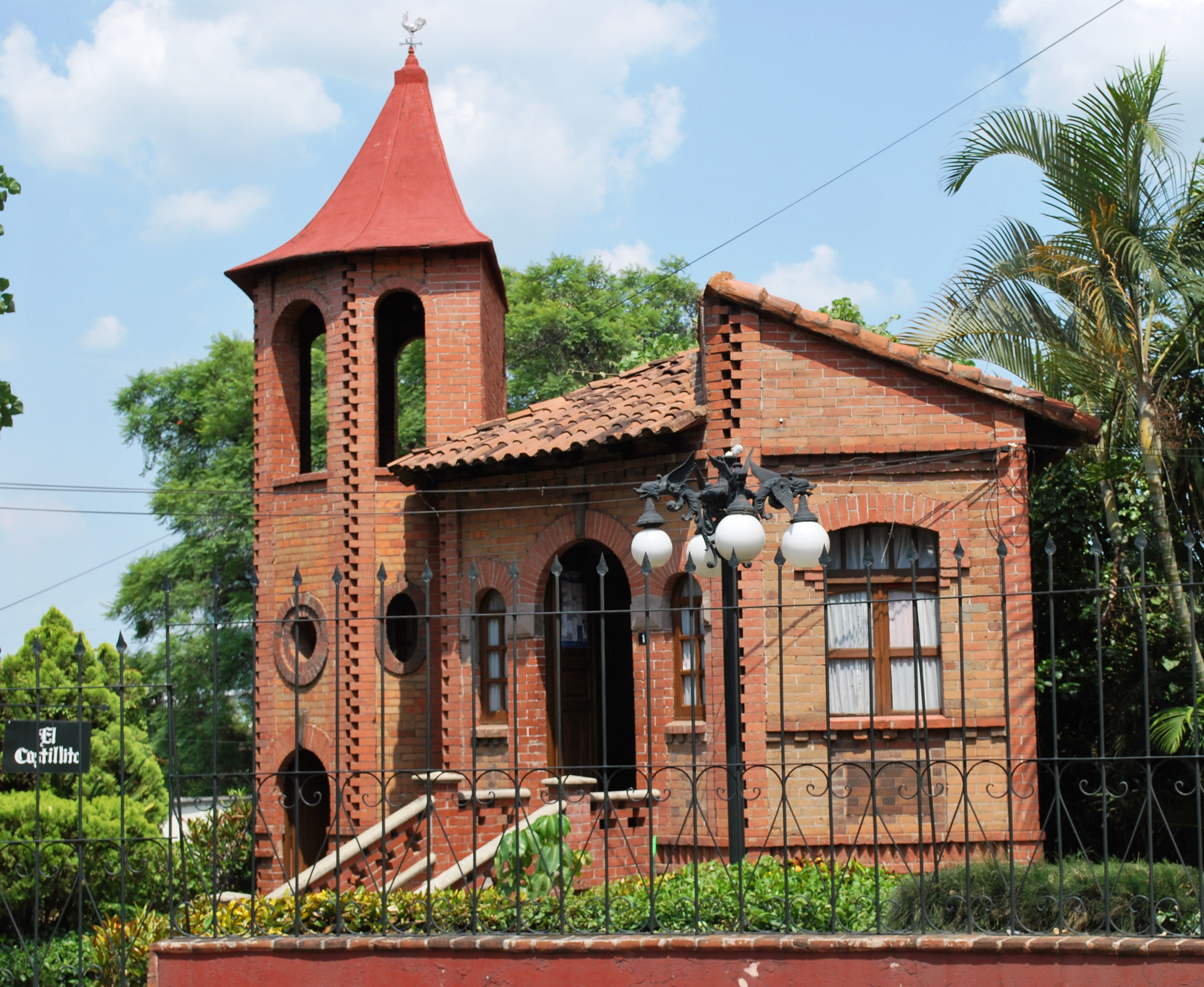
Museo Fotográfico de Cuernavaca (El Castillito), house built in early 20th century.

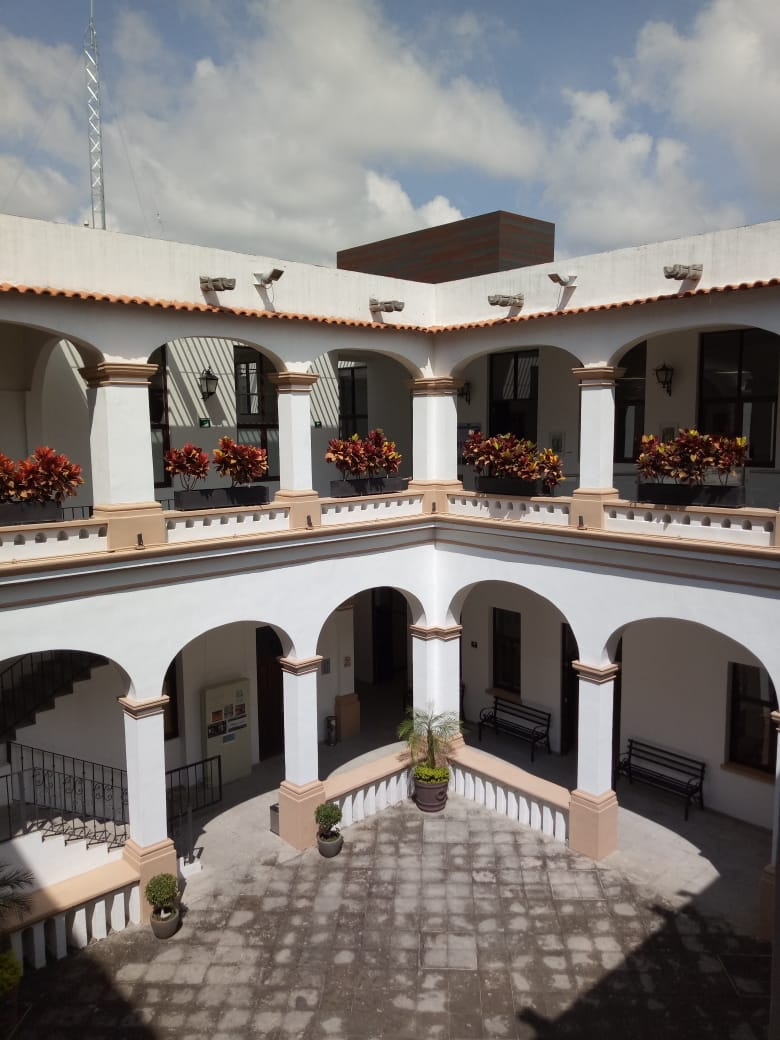
Museo de Arte Indígena Contemporáneo, building built in 17th century.

=== Teopanzolco ===
Teopanzolco is an archeological site located just east of the historic downtown of Cuernavaca. Until recently its construction was dated to the year 1427, but new evidence revealed by 19 September 2017 earthquake suggests the original structure was built between 1150 and 1200 CE. Teopanzolco was an important ceremonial center during the 15th and 16th centuries when the native Tlahuicas were dominated by the Aztecs. The site shows significant Aztec influence. It has a large pyramidal base, called the Gran Basamento, topped by two shrines, much like the Templo Mayor in Tenochtitlan. In fact, the new finds indicate that Teopanzolco predates the Templo Mayor and served as a model for the latter. Only the stone columns of these shrines remain today. The teocalli, (sacred plaza) contains fourteen monuments including a circular altar dedicated to the wind deity Ehécatl. There are also two concentric structures separated by a moat or ditch. Both might have been dedicated to Quetzalcoatl, the feathered-serpent deity, or to Tlāloc, god or rain. The ruins were discovered during the Siege of Cuernavaca in 1914 as the Zapatistas used the heights to place their cannons.

==== Centro Cultural Teopanzolco ====
The Cultural Center next to the pyramids has recently been remodeled and now includes several first-class concert halls. There is outside seating facing the pyramids where one can see a video mapping of the pyramid site (Spanish only). centro-cultural-teopanzolco/ English (Retrieved Dec 16, 2016)

=== Borda Garden ===
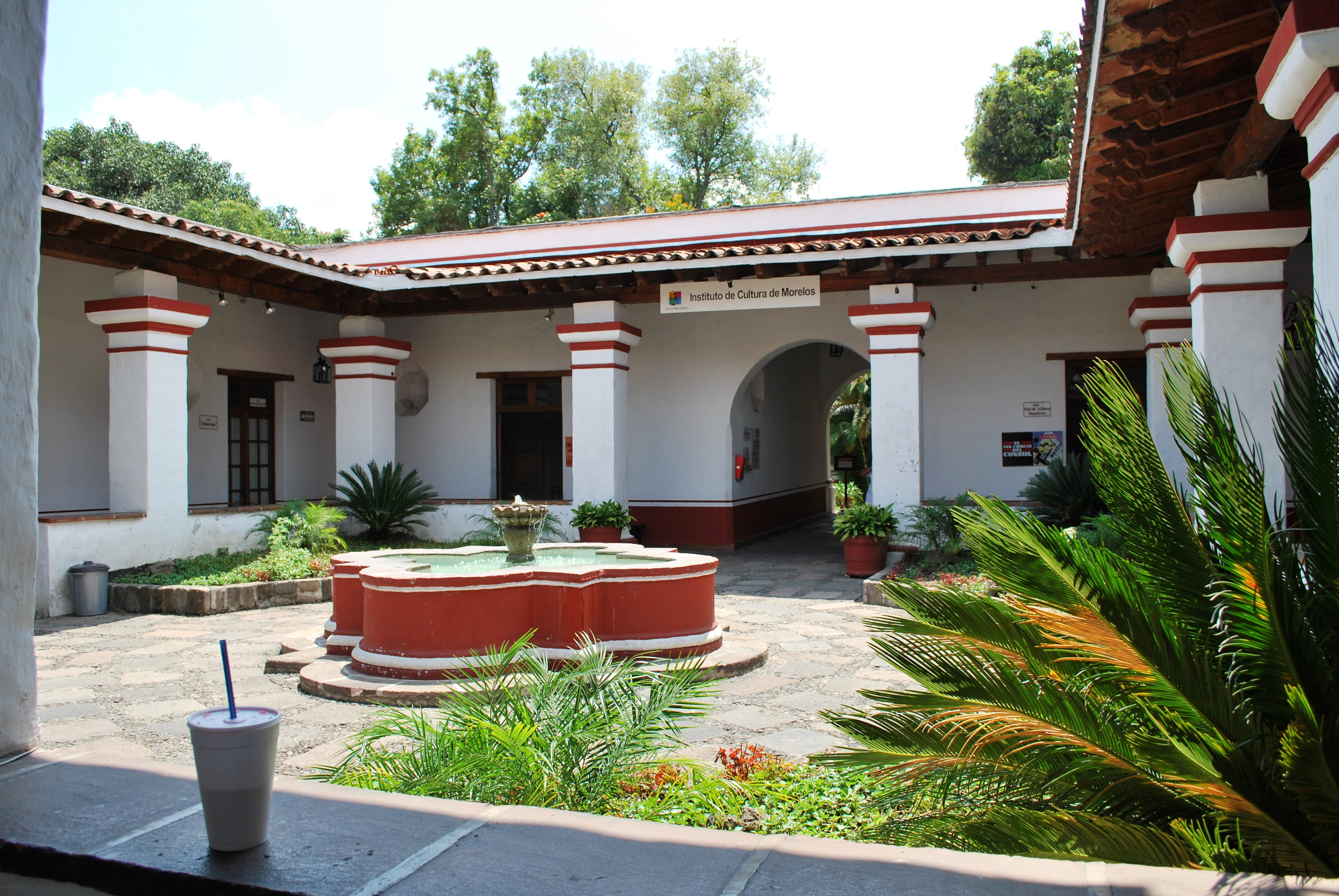
Borda House courtyard

The Borda Garden is located near the cathedral on Morelos Street. Originally, this was a house bought by José de la Borda, the mining magnate of Taxco in the mid-18th century. Later, his son, Manuel de Borda y Verdugo, transformed the grounds of the house into gardens filled with flower and fruit trees to satisfy his passion for botany. These gardens also contain a number of fountains and an artificial lake that were completed in 1783. Today the complex contains an art gallery, offices, a restaurant, and an open-air theater. In 1865, this was the summer home of Emperor Maximilian I and his wife Carlota Amalia. Some sources say the emperor met his mistress, "La India Bonita", there, (although other sources say they met at his home called "El Olindo" in Acapantzingo.) In the late 19th and early 20th centuries the Borda Garden sponsored soirees, such as those sponsored by Porfirio Díaz and Emiliano Zapata. Today the area is a public park where the gardens have been maintained and it is possible to take a short boat ride on the lake. The house has been converted into a museum. Six of its halls are dedicated to temporary exhibits while the other seven are devoted to recreating the characteristics of the 18th and 19th centuries.

The Church of Nuestra Señora de Guadalupe is located next to the Borda Garden, and was constructed by Manuel de la Borda in 1784. It has a Baroque façade and what is considered to be the best cupola in the city. It was the royal chapel of Emperor Maximilian. The cupola was badly damaged in the earthquake of 2017.

=== Robert Brady Museum ===
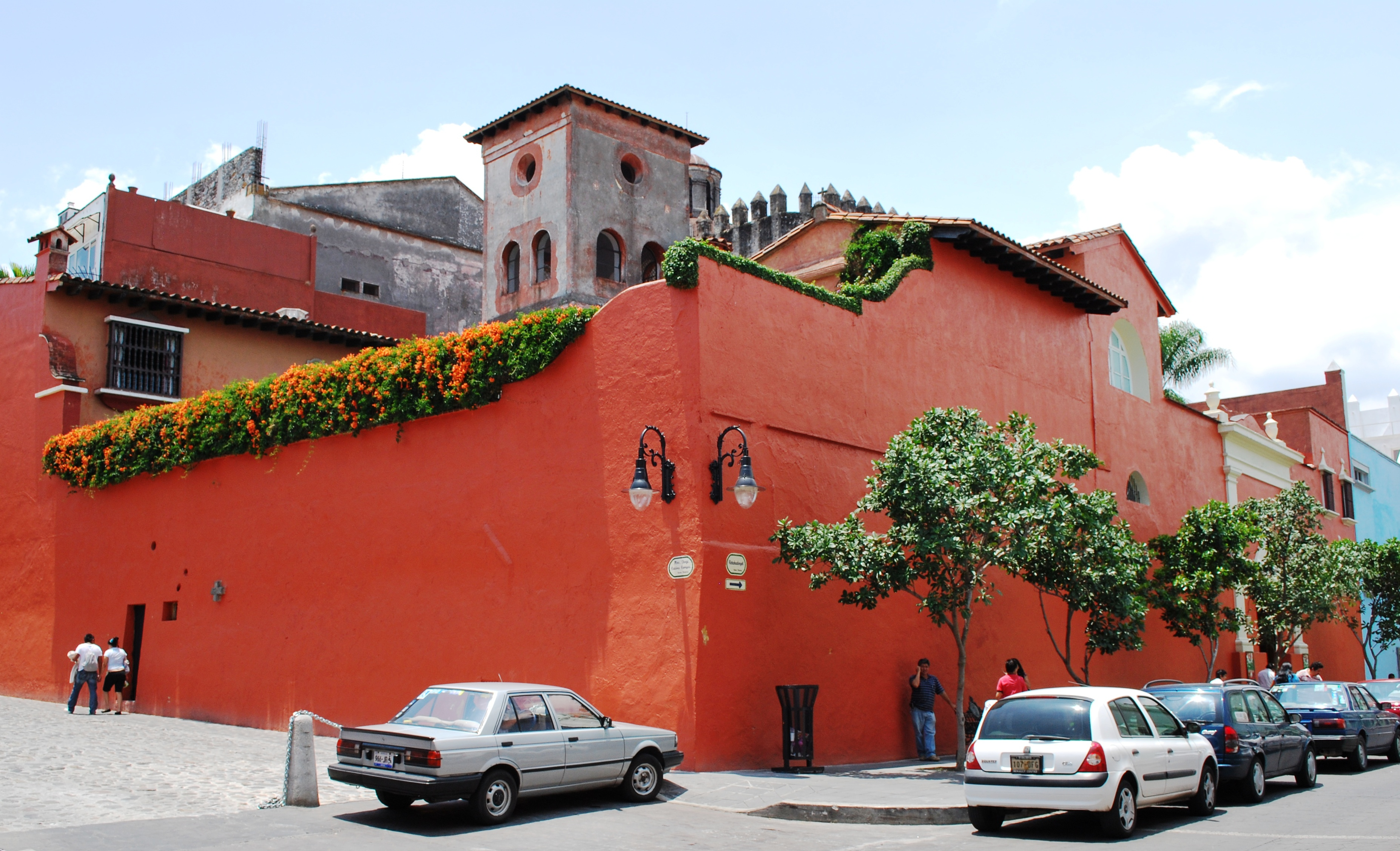
Exterior of the Museum

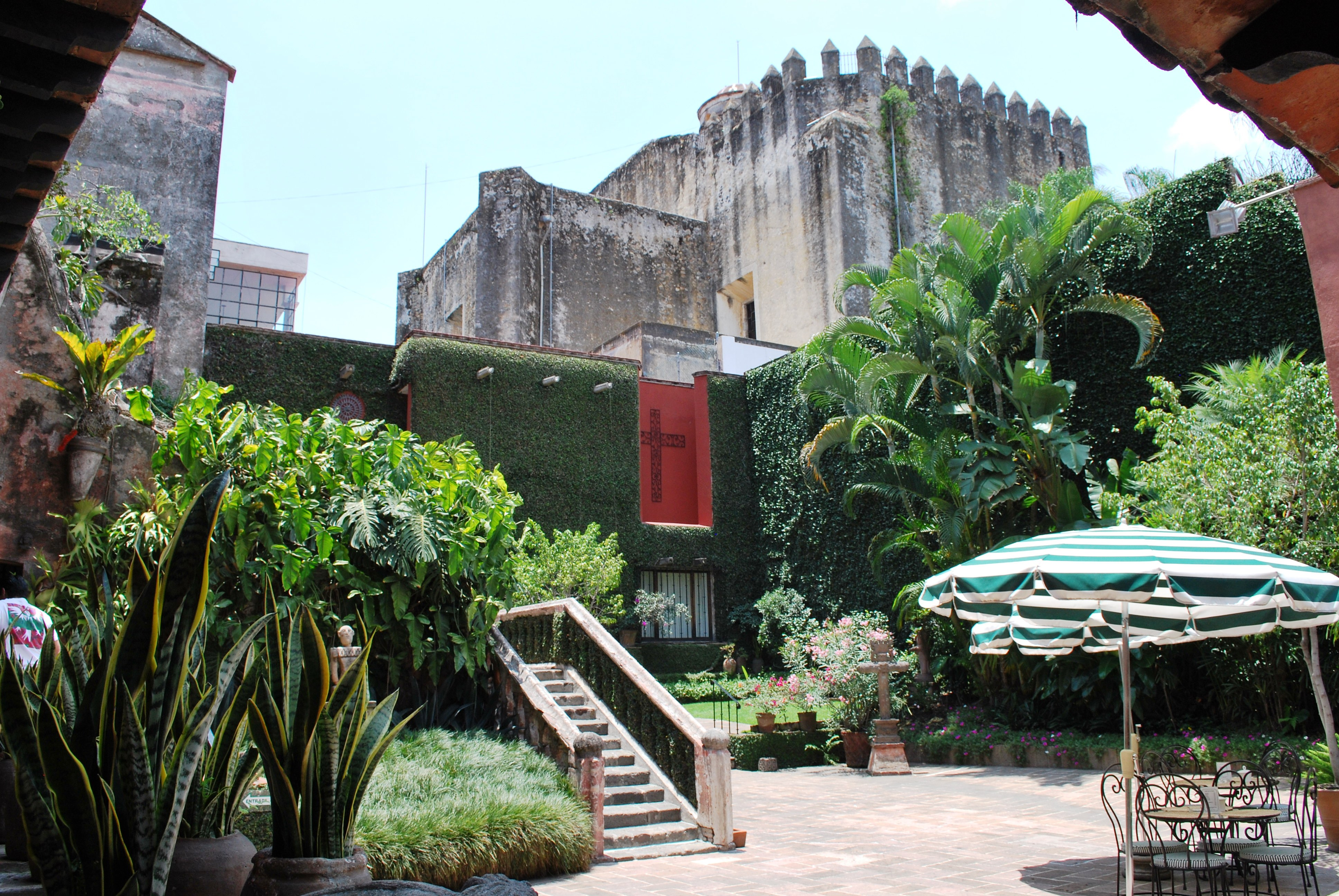
Museum Courtyard

The Robert Brady Museum is on Nezahualcoyotl Street and occupies the building known as the Casa de la Torre, originally part of the monastery of La Asunción. In 1960, it was purchased by the U.S. artist, Robert Brady, who transformed it into his home and a private art and collectible museum. It contains a collection of art and crafts from around the world as well as the original Self-Portrait with Monkey painted by Frida Kahlo. Other works are by artists such as Miguel Cobarruvias, Pelegrí Clavé, María Izquierdo, and Rufino Tamayo. Non-Mexican paintings include those from North America and Europe. Other objects in the collection include antique furniture, African and Indian crafts, and archeological pieces. The collection occupies fourteen rooms of the old house, which has been kept mostly the way it was when Brady died in 1986 and bequeathed the house and its contents to the city.

=== Tlaltenango ===
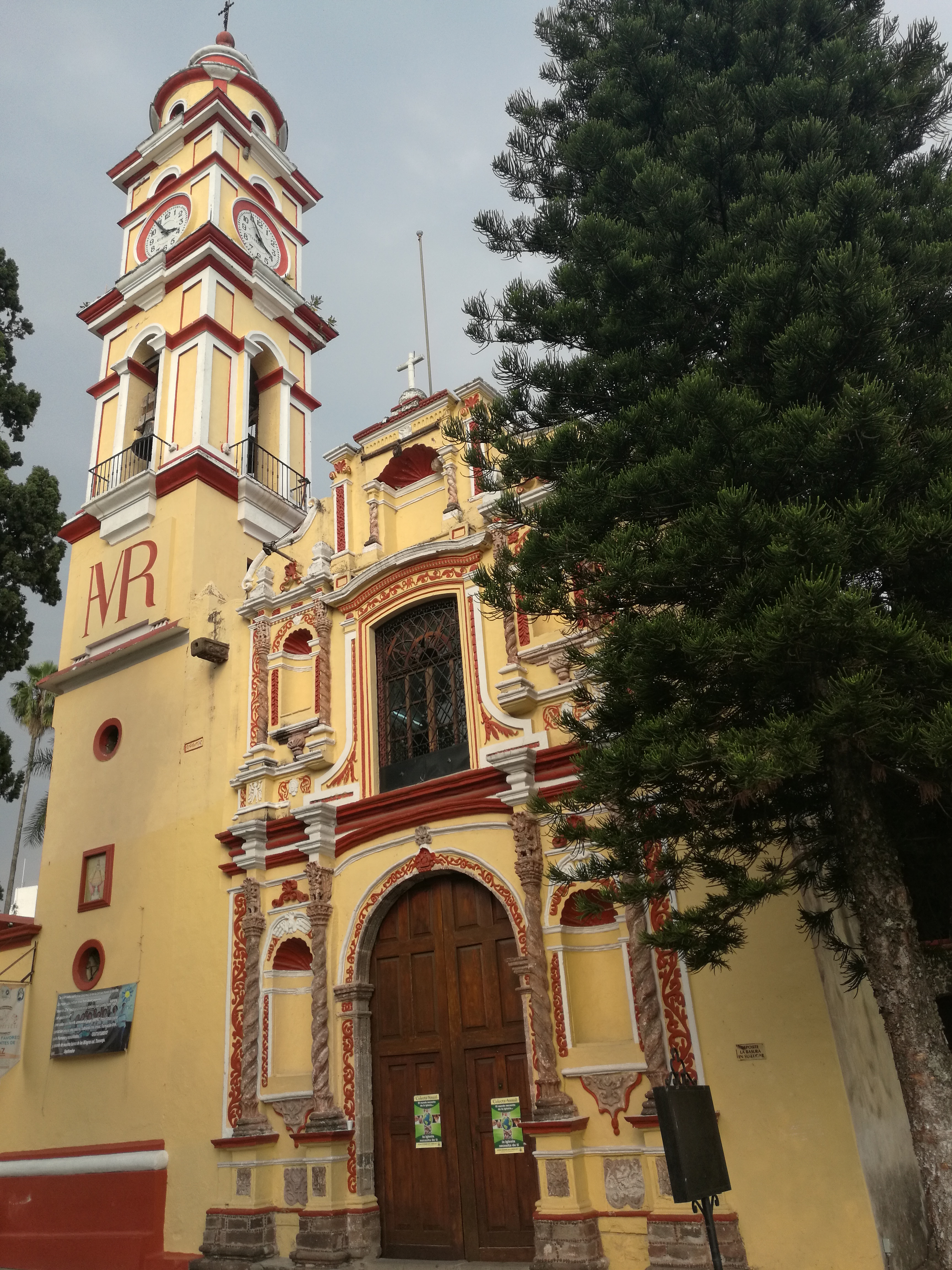
Atrium and façade of the Nuestra Señora de los Milagros Church

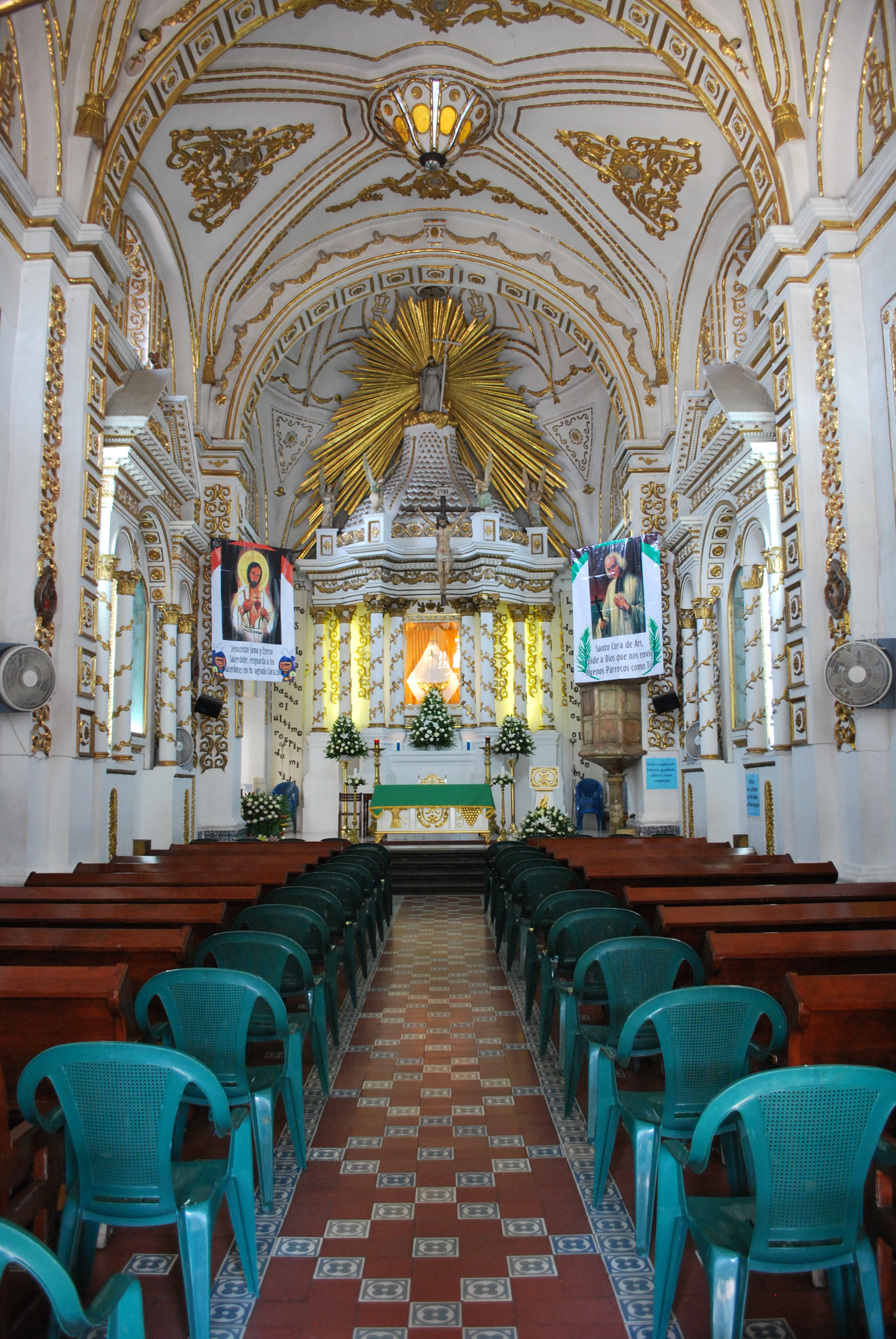
interior of the Church of San Jose

Tlaltenango used to be a separate town, but now is a neighborhood of Cuernavaca city. The main attraction there is the church compound containing the Church of San José and the Church of Nuestra Señora de los Milagros de Tlaltenango. San José is one of the oldest churches in Mexico, built between 1521 and 1523. Two centuries later an image of the Virgin appeared to members of this village, prompting the building of the second church. This is the Sanctuary of Nuestra Señora de los Milagros, which was built in 1730, with its bell towers built at the end of the 19th century.

=== Hacienda Atlacomulco ===
The Hacienda de San Antonio Atlacomulco is located south of the Cuernavaca and was established by Hernán Cortés as one of the first sugar plantations in Mexico. Descendants of the Conquistador held the property until the 19th century, when it became the property of Lucas Alamán, who modernized the facility. The hacienda lost its surrounding properties during the Mexican Revolution and all that remains is the main house. After a long period of restoration and modification, the hacienda today houses an exclusive hotel, which can accommodate conventions and banquets.

=== Museum of Traditional and Herbal Medicine and the Ethnicbotanical garden ===
South of the city center is Acapantzingo, which had been a separate town, but now is part of the city. A large farm owned by Emperor Maximilian I existed there in the 1860s. It was named Olindo, referring to a character in the poem by Torquato Tasso. The emperor used this property as one of his residences in Cuernavaca, and according to rumor, to enjoy the company of a certain beautiful Indian woman. On this farm and in what was the Pavilion, is now the Museum of Traditional and Herbal Medicine (Museo de Medicina Tradicional). The museum sponsors workshops and classes on the use of plants to make soap, cremes, dyes, decorative objects and more. Outside is the ethnicbotanical garden with exhibits including 800 species of plants organized by uses, such as the making of textiles, animal feed, condiments, ritual, and others.

=== Children's "Kite" Museum ===
Located on Avenida Vicente Guerrero 205, Colonia Lomas de Selva is the Papalote Children's Museum an interactive children's museum with up to thirty exhibitions and artistic experiences for children, such as a bed of nails, Vincent van Gogh room, Lego, garden, sandbox, bubble factory, and others. Some exhibits are even for children under 3.

=== Chapultepec Ecological Park ===
The Chapultepec Ecological Park is located about four km southeast of the Cuernavaca city center. It contains fresh-water springs, which form the beginning of a river, and is surrounded by large trees called Chapultepec. It is a public park administered by the State Commission of Water and Environment. In addition to playgrounds, the park has constructed habitats for monkeys, birds, butterflies, crocodiles, reptiles, aquatic plants, and orchids. It also has a petting zoo, environmental museum, planetarium, house of terror, theater, and tour train. Beginning December 2018, Diana Ríos, a Mexican designer and artist working with the company Veneno Ríos is in charge of creating a new façade called "Metamorphosis" inspired in evolution and species changes as well as the love of nature in Morelos. Featured species are the cangrejito barranqueño (a crab), the carpita morelense (carp), and the amate amarillo (yellow fig tree).

=== Chapitel del Calvario ===
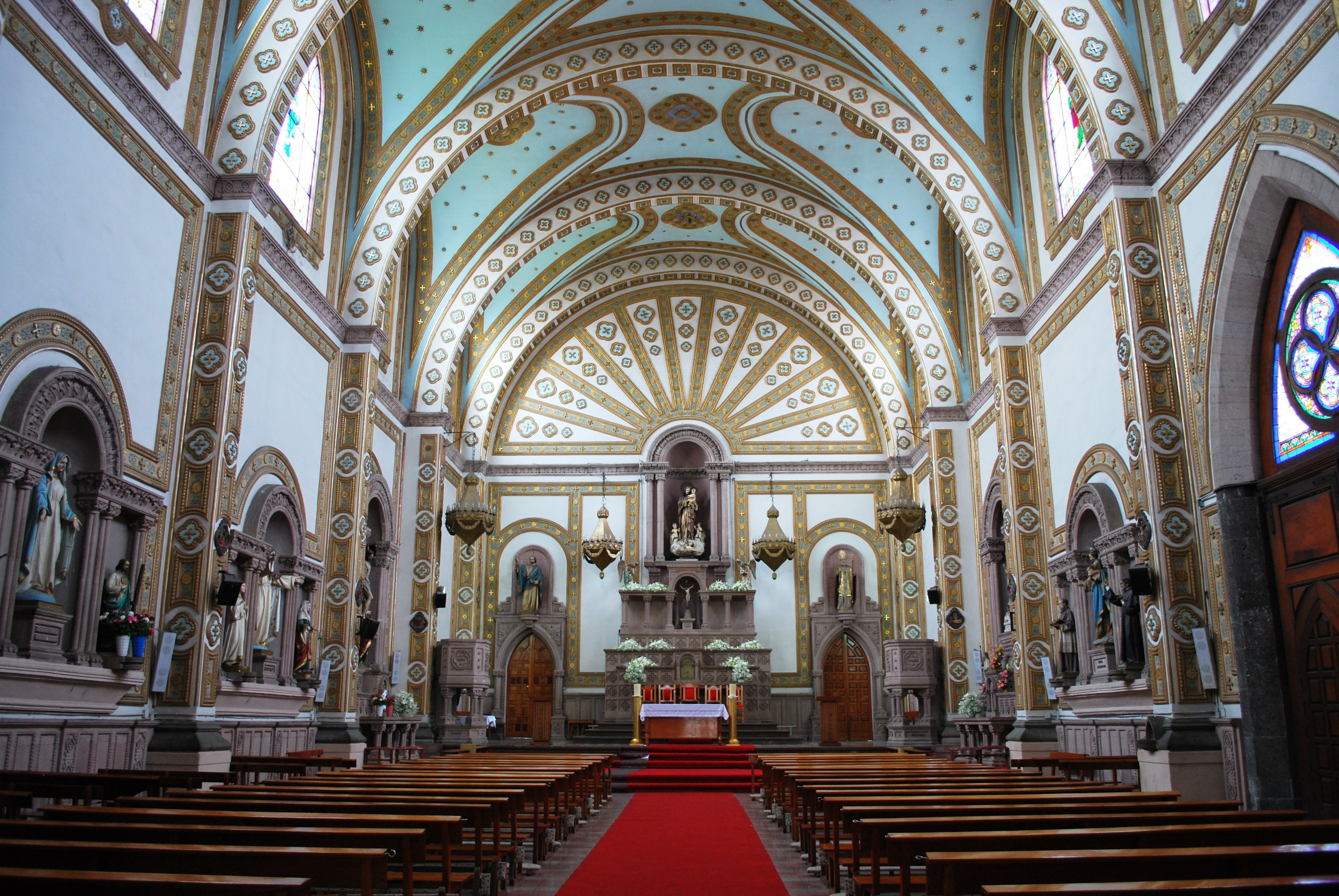
Interior of the Chapitel del Calvario

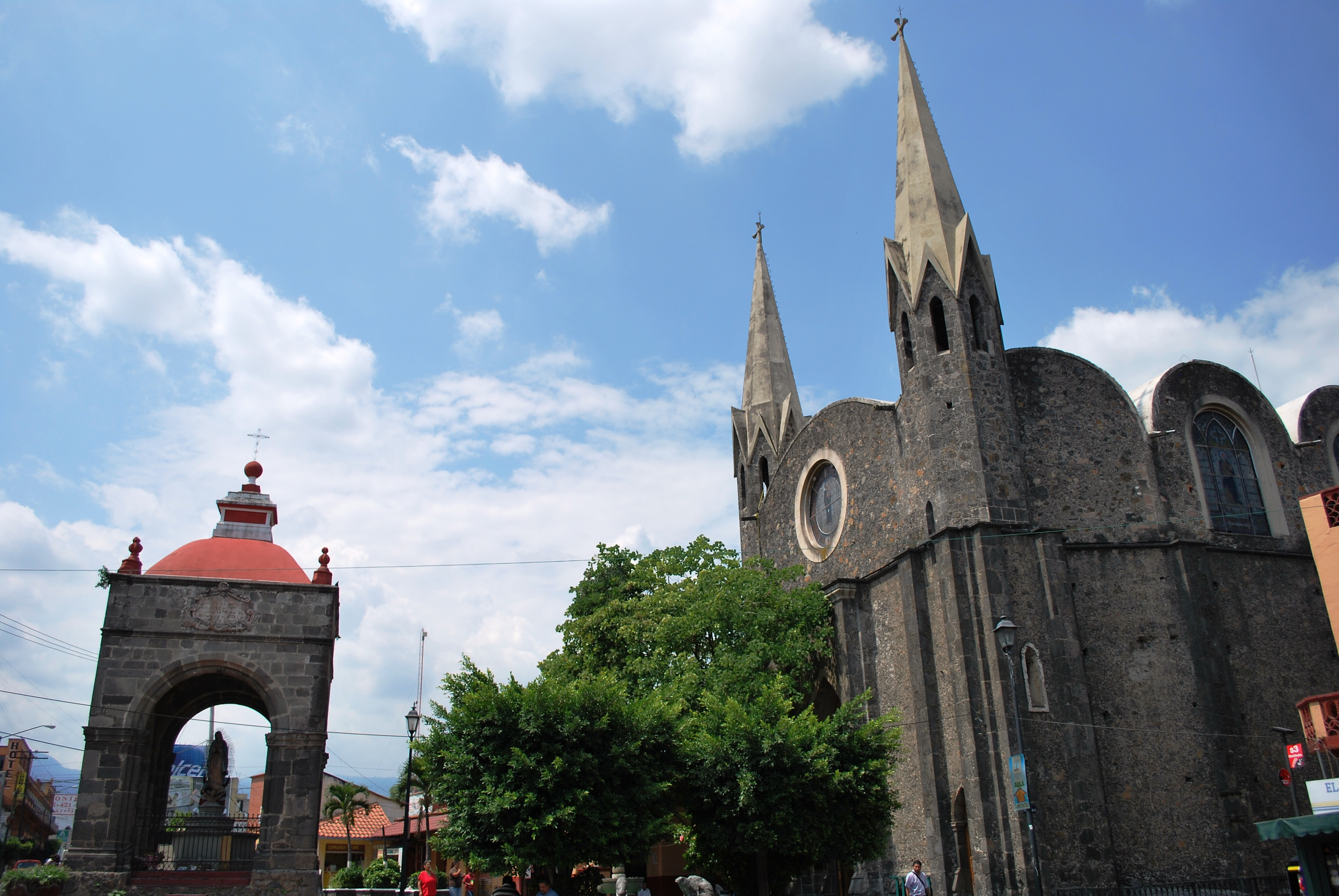
The Chapitel del Calvario

The Chapitel del Calvario is a church located at the corner of Morelos and Matamoros Streets, which was constructed in 1532. The word "chapitel" means "spire" as the church is named after two spires that define its appearance. It also has a fourteen-meter-high dome. It was constructed in the 16th century and was the last building encountered within Cuernavaca, as one left the city on the road to Mexico City. In 1772, this church was dedicated to the Virgin of Guadalupe.

=== El Castillito ===
The Museo de Fotografía Antigua, also known as El Castillito (the little castle), is located one block from the Chapitel del Calvario. It is a very small, brick building that dates from the early 20th century when it was built as a home for the caretaker of the park that is next to the bridge built by Porfirio Diaz. It was later abandoned until Governor Vicente Estrada Cajigal remodeled it as his residence. Since 1986 it has been a small museum dedicated to antique photographs of the city of Cuernavaca.

=== Salto de San Antón / St. Anthony Waterfall ===
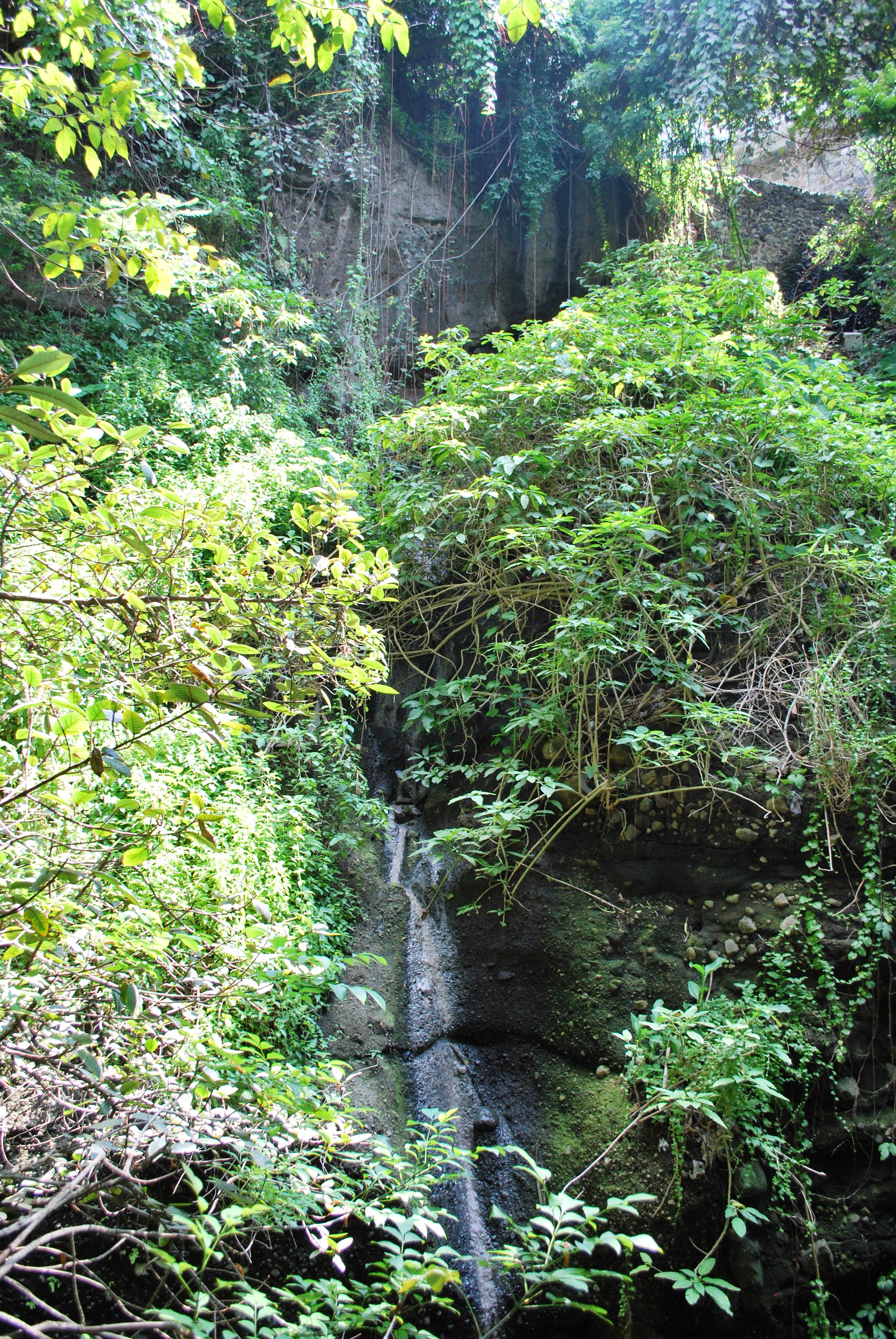
Inside the Salto de San Antón ravine

The Salto de San Anton is a large ravine with a thin but tall waterfall located in the neighborhood of San Anton Analco on the west side of Cuernavaca. The waterfall is 36 metres (118 feet) high, with its water coming from a small tributary of the Zempoala River. The vertical walls of the ravine are of basalt and broad-leafed vegetation grows in nooks and crannies of the stone. A series of stairs and platforms have been built to enable access to the waterfall area from the park above.

=== Museo Morelense de Arte Contemporáneo Juan Soriano ===
The Juan Soriano Museum of Contemporary Art is located east of downtown near the Adolfo López Mateos Market in Colonia Amatitlan. The museum opened amidst controversy on 8 June 2018, and includes a collection of 1,200 paintings, sculptures, drawings, and photographs, including a permanent collection of works by the artist Juan Soriano. The museum was designed by the architect Javier Sanchez and it cost 300 million pesos (US$15 million) to build.

=== Ravine of Amanalco Park / Barranca de Amanalco ===
The ravines of Cuernavaca play a major role in regulating the climate of the city. One of the most important is the Ravine of Amanalco, which served as a natural defensive line for the city of Cuauhuanauc during the Spanish conquest of 1520, until Hernán Cortés managed to cross it where the modern "Puente del Diablo" is located.

The Ravine of Amanalco Park opened in the 1990s and features a 352-meter long walkway beginning at the Porfirio Díaz bridge and ending at the arches of a colonial-era aqueduct of Carlos Cuagila Street. The walkway passes under dense foliage, and sounds include birds and running water.

One can view of the under area of the bridge, which was built at the end of the 19th century in order to connect the center of the city and the railway station via trolly.

=== La Tallera David Alfaro Siqueiros / David Alfaro Siqueiros House & Studio ===
The David Alfaro Siqueiros House and Studio in Cuernavaca, was donated to "the people of Mexico" by David Alfaro Siqueiros (1896–1974). In the late fifties, Siqueiros was creating the mural Del Porfirismo a la Revolución (1957–66). On 9 August 1960, this project was abandoned because he was charged with the crime of "social dissolution" and the muralist was imprisoned. When he left prison in 1964, Siqueiros finished the mural and built a house and workshop in the city of Cuernavaca. There, he lived and executed the mural La Marcha de la Humanidad (1971–73), currently located at the Polyforum Siqueiros.

The house/workshop is located in Parque Siqueiros at the intersection of Calles Marte and Venus, Colonia Jardines de Cuernavaca. It is recommended that one enter from Calle Marte in order to fully appreciate the recently restored murals outside. Free. Siqueiros Park & Studio (English) Retrieved Dec 16, 2018

=== Other museums ===
La Casona Spencer (Spencer House) is a cultural center designed to promote the arts. Opened in 2006, the building, located across from the cathedral, dates from colonial time. It was donated to the city upon the death of British artist John Spencer.

Morelos Museum of Popular Arts is located downtown on Hidalgo Street between the cathedral and the Cuauhnahuac Museum. The museum opened in 2016 and features traditional art of Morelos and other parts of Mexico, including ceramics, wax sculpture, and pottery. The exhibits are changed often, and there is a gift shop.

City Museum / Museo de la Ciudad de Cuernavaca (MuCIC) is located in a two-story colonial building on Avenida Morelos next to the Borda Garden. There are six halls for permanent exhibitions and six halls for temporary exhibitions. Since its beginnings in the 16th century, the building has been closely associated with the religious, social, and cultural life of the city. There is a retrospective exhibit of the life of Emiliano Zapata Salazar on the second floor.

Museum of Contemporary Indigenous Art harbors works of 12 ethnic groups of Mexico: Rarámuri, Yoreme, Yaqui, Purhépecha, Huichol, Mazahua, Otomí (or Hñahñu), Nahua, Mixtec, Tzotzil, Tzeltal, and Zapotec, besides spaces dedicated to the cultural communities of Mata Ortiz and the peoples of Morelos. We can view textiles, pottery, wood carvings, and ceramics. The collection belongs to the foundation Pro-Niño Marginado N.G.O. The Autonomous University of Morelos (UAEM) is the custodian of its protection, preservation, research, and exhibition. The building it occupies today was constructed in the 16th century. It is the oldest civilian building on Morelos Avenue, in downtown Cuernavaca.

Museo Güelu is a small modern art museum that is run by Fundacion Fernando Cue Gomez, A.C.. It is located on Ixtalapa Street across from the pyramids in Vista Hermosa.

Science Museum / Museo de Ciencias is located in San Miguel Acapantzingo Park, Colonia Cantarranas, where the state penitentiary stood from 1934 to 2000. This is a hands-on museum designed for informal teaching related to scientific issues. There are two permanent exhibition halls: one dedicated to water and the other dedicated to climate change. The museum offers workshops for children on Mechatronics and Robotics, as well as a 120-seat auditorium and temporary exhibit halls. There is a separate building dedicated to Planet Earth in the park, and there is a Cuexcomate (traditional silo) on the site.

Museum of Sacred Art / Museo de Arte Sacro de Cuernavaca is located within the cathedral, spread over two floors of what was once the cloister. There are numerous religious objects on view.

=== Parks and diversion ===
Solidarity Park / Parque Alameda Luis Donaldo Colosio Murrieta is located on Paseo Cuauhnáhuac east of the freeway. It was named in honor of a presidential candidate who was assassinated in 1994. Entering the park, there is a large fountain built to resemble the ball court in Coatetelco archaeological site. Directly ahead is a public library "Biblioteca 17 de Abril", which has a large mural depicting the history of the State of Morelos. There is also a statue of José María Morelos in front of the building. Visitors can enjoy volleyball, basketball, and mini-soccer fields, as well as a bicycle path, rollerblading rink, and an artificial lake.

San Miguel Acapantzingo Park is located on Calle Altlacumolco in Colonia Cantarranas south of the market. The site was previously the state penitentiary (1934–2000), and you can see a small section of one of the cells there. The Science Museum, Casa Tierra (Earth House), a dancing fountain, a jogging path, a playground, and a Cuexcomate (traditional silo) are in the park. There is also a Byzantine mural called Despertar en Primavera (Waking up in Spring).

Tlatenango Ecological Park is located on Avenida Zapata at the traffic circle in the north of the city. This park has a projection room for children's movies, exhibit halls for artists, tennis courts, and an open-air gym.

Chapultepec Ecological Park is located off Plan de Ayala in Colonia Chapultepec near the IMSS hospital. The park covers 11 hectares of land and runs lineally for more than 1.5 km. Near the entrance, there is a spring which runs into a crystal-clear stream surrounded by trees, some of which are more than 250 years old. Species include ahuehuetes (cypress), amates (fig trees), guava, and others. There is a butterfly sanctuary, an orchid exhibit, and several species of birds, mammals, and reptiles on display. There is a house of horror, a planetarium, a tourist train, a petting zoo, a solar house, a large exhibit hall, and an artificial lake with paddle boats. There are also cultural spaces for dance, music, and theater. A fair selling local, natural products is held on Sundays.

Melchor Ocampo Garden of Art was inaugurated by Porfirio Díaz, on 11 December 1897, and was built as part of the festivities for the arrival of the railroad to Cuernavaca. Governor Vicente Estrada Cajigal in 1934, built a rudimentary zoo and a swimming pool and the name was changed to "Parque Emiliano Zapata". The zoo and park are mentioned in the novel Under the Volcano by Malcolm Lowry. The park was remodeled in 2013 and its name reverted to Melchor Ocampo, a space where natural or vegan products are bought and sold, and crafts are exhibited and sold. Every last Sunday of the month, dogs and cats are sterilized for free while others are offered in adoption. The park is located in the Barrio de Gualupita, near the Pullman de Morelos/Selva bus station.

Revolution Park is downtown. There is a basketball gym, a volleyball gym, a 25-meter swimming pool, and an area for playing chess.

Unidad Deportiva Centenario (Centennial Sports Center) near the UAEM has a soccer stadium, baseball field, and gyms for a variety of different sports.

El Miraval is a sports complex (including soccer field) in the neighborhood of the same name (Valley Overlook).

Parque lineal Ferrocarril de Cuernavaca is a bicycle path that follows the former rail line between Av. Rio Mayo and Av. San Diego. The bicycle path is also popular with rollerbladers, dog walkers, and joggers. Cyclists can continue all the way to the Picacho-Ajusco highway.

La Cascada (the waterfall) water park features a small waterfall, Olympic swimming pool, picnic area, parking, and basketball and volleyball courts. It is located on Vicente Guerrero Street in Colonia Las Granjas.

Barranca de Chalchihuapan (Chalchihuapan Ravine) is in the town of Santa María Ahuacatitlán, north of Cuernavaca. There are rustic ponds and a river for raising trout. Visitors can choose the fish they like which is then caught and prepared on site. Visitors can also enjoy the mixed forest, a natural spring, and during the rainy season, there is a waterfall. Visitors can take guided tours, and go camping and birdwatching.

Children and adults can visit El Túnel (the tunnel), an important source of drinking water for Cuernavaca. El Túnel was discovered by Eugenio Jesús Cañas in 1898, and in 1932 pipes were laid. The tunnel is located on Fco. I. Madero, Colonia Miraval.

Cuernavaca has two private golf courses: Club de Golf Tabachines located near the expressway and Club de Golf de Cuernavaca located a few blocks south of downtown.

=== Monuments ===
Morelotes is a large statue of Jose Maria Morelos y Pavon designed by sculptor Juan Olaguíbel in the 1940s. It is located in the Zocalo. There is a smaller statue of Morelos in front of the library at Solidarity Park.

Cuauhtemoc (1496-1525) was the last emperor (tlatoani) of Tenochtitlan. He was infamously tortured by Hernán Cortés, who wanted him to reveal where he kept his gold. The statue is located at the intersection of Teopanzolco and Nueva Belgica, Fracc Rincon Del Valle, and was dedicated while Rogelio Sanchez Gatica was Presidente Municipal (2012). (Statue was previously near the train station.)

Paloma de la Paz (Dove of Peace) is located at the traffic circle at the intersection of Av. Heróico Colegio Militar and Av. Domingo Diez. Designed by Víctor Manuel Contreras, it is the first thing visitors from Mexico City see as they get off the tollway.

Monument to General Carlos Pacheco Villalobos who fought alongside Benito Juarez against Maximiliano. He was the first governor of the state (1877-1879). The statue is located in front of the Palace of Cortes.

Monument to Manuel Ávila Camacho is located at the traffic circle of the street that bears his name and Calzada de los Compositores in Lomas de Atzingo. The bronze statue of the president was built in October 1957 by Everardo Hernández Rodríguez.

Monument to Vicente Guerrero is located on Av. Vicente Guerrero in Colonia Lomas de la Selva. Guerrero was a military leader during the Mexican War of Independence and Mexico's second president.

A statue of Emiliano Zapata is located at the traffic circle at Av. Zapata and Av. Heróico Colegio Militar.

A statue of the Niño Artillero, Narciso Mendoza, is located at the traffic circle at the intersection of Av. Morelos Sur and Juarez Blvd. in Las Palmas. As a twelve-year-old, Mendoza bravely fired a cannon at the royalist troops during the 1812 Siege of Cuautla.

Libertad de Expression (Freedom of the Press) is located on Teopanzolco in Vista Hermosa. Of the 264 names of journalists who have been killed since the 19th century, 115 have been killed in the 20th century (up to Dec. 2018).

A statue of Alexander von Humboldt is located in front of the Spencer House on Hidalgo Street downtown. Humboldt nicknamed Cuernavaca The City of Eternal Spring during his 1805 visit.

A statue of Benito Juarez is located on Juarez Blvd. at Motolinia St., south of the Palacio de Cortes. It was erected by the local Mason lodges. At the same site, there is a smaller work to honor the Winter Solstice of 21 December 2012, also erected by the Masons.

There is a bust of Maria Felix in Plaza Maria Bonita in front of Parque Melchor Ocampo in Gualupita.

Acueducto de Gualupita Calle Carlos Cuaglia, Gualupita, at the Barranca de Amanalco.

Porfirio Díaz bridge was built in the 1890s to connect downtown and the train station via a horse-drawn trolly. The other entrance to the Barranca de Amanalco is located here. The Photography Museum was originally built for the gardener who took care of the area surrounding the bridge.

Stampeding Horses, Five Bathing Nymphs, and Diana the Huntress is at Plaza Gustavo Baz are in Colonia Vista Hermosa. in Vista Hermosa. A sign notes that Scouts de Mexico meets at Plaza Gustavo Baz on Saturdays.

Capilla Culhuacán de los Dolores and Capilla de Nuestra Señora de los Dolores are in Ocotopec. Capilla de los Santos Reyes is a 16th-century chapel in Tetela del Monte in the north of the city. The bell tower dates from the 17th century, and the chapel is constructed in a primitive Baroque style. Artist John Spencer rebuilt the walls in the 1980s. Capilla de los Tepetates (Jesus de Nazareth) is on Arteaga St. downtown, off Guerero Street. Capilla de San Diego (or San Diegito) is a small 16th century chapel on Galeana St. in Acapantzingo. His feast is in mid-November. Capilla de San Francisco was built in the 16th century before the Cathedral so the monks would have a place of worship during the construction of the latter. It is on Galeana Street downtown. Capilla de San Miguel Acapantzingo was built in the 16th century on Matamoros Street in Acapantzingo, across from the Casa de Maximiliano/Botanical Garden. The chapel suffered some damage during the 2017 earthquake, but it has been restored. His feast is 29 September. Parroquia de la Resurección del Señor y Santa María de Guadalupe is outside Melchor Ocampo Park. Parroquia de San Antonio de Padua is a colonial church on Jesús H. Preciado St., San Antón on the west side of the city, near the Cascada de San Antonio. There are several places to purchase potted plants in the neighborhood. Templo de Guadalupe on Av. Morelos, Centro is an 18th-century church built by Jose de la Borda next to the Jardin Borda. Templo de San Pablo is on Humboldt Street downtown. 18th century. Capilla de San Juan Evangelista is on Calle Sn. Juan, Col. Chapultepec. 18th century.

The train station dates from the late 19th century and is located east of Plan de Ayala. Today it hosts a dance studio.

Cine Morelos' on Av. Morelos, Centro, was constructed in the 19th century. Today the theater shows art films.

Puente del Diablo bridge crosses the Barranca de Amanalco at the point where the devil himself, Hernán Cortés, entered the city of Cuauhnahuac in 1521.

Calle Rufino Tamayo was previously called Cinco de Mayo, and before that, it was called Camino al Pueblo de San Miguel Acapantzingo. The bridge across the ravine is called La Emperatriz Muralist Diego Rivera lived at a house located at the corner of Rufino Tamayo and Morelos St. in Colonia Acapantzingo from 1951 to 1957. Artist Rufino Tamayo (1899–1991) lived in a house on the Privada located near Calle Humboldt.

There is a statue dedicated to women at the corner of C. Humboldt and Salazar, across from La Vecindad (the Neighborhood) Children's Cultural Center. The statue was erected on 8 March 1982. A statue of Blind Justice is in front of the Palacio de Justicia behind the Cortes Palace. A plaque on a building on Hidalgo St. in the Historic Center, across from the Cortes Palace, notes that artist Jorge Cazares Campos was born there. The plaque is dated 20 November 2005. He was born on 20 November 1937, and several of his works are on display throughout the city.

== Festivals and dance ==
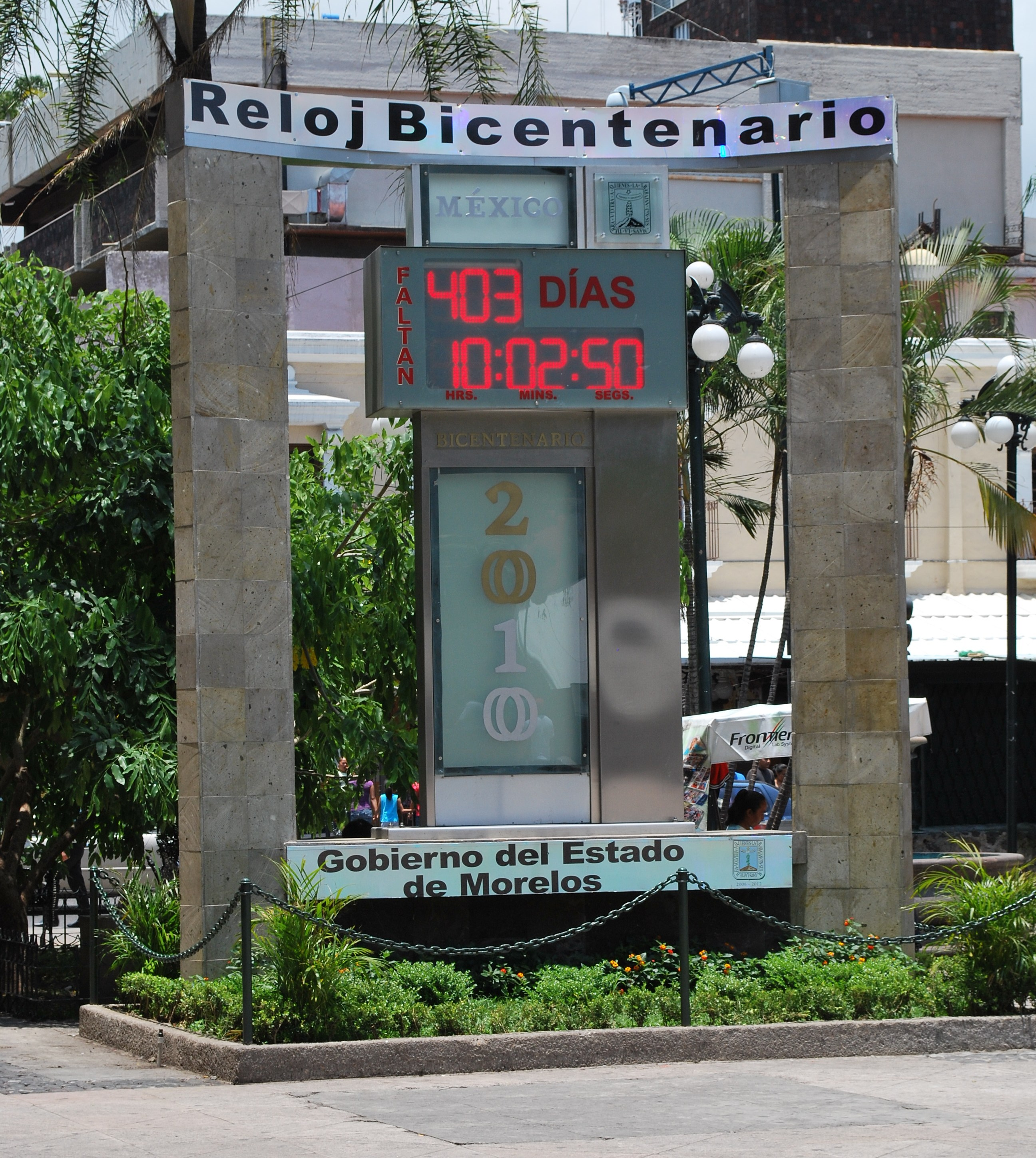
Clock ticking down to Mexico's Bicentennial celebrations in Parque Morelos

The Feria de la Flor was established in 1965 as a festival that is held from 2 to 12 May. In the Borda Garden, flower growers from all over Mexico come to exhibit their wares, competing for an annual prize. The event also has traditional fair rides, cockfights, and horse competitions as well as music and sociocultural events. Neighborhood celebrations are held in Cuernavaca, mostly for patron saints, they include 15 May, the feast of San Isidro Labrador; 13 June, the feast of San Antonio in the neighborhood of San Antón, with Aztec dances; 6 August, the feast of the Savior or the Transfiguration in Ocotepec, featuring the Moors and Christians dance, mole, and pulque; 10 August the feast of San Lorenzo in Chamilpa; 15 August, the festival of the Assumption of Mary in Santa María Ahuacatilán; and 8 September, Festival of Nuestra Señora de los Milagros in Tlaltenango. Since 1965, the city Cuernavaca has had a carnival as well.

The Huehuechis, a dance group, was started in Cuernavaca in 1870 by a group of young people. They dressed up in old boots and clothes, covering their faces with cloth, dancing sponteaneously in the streets with whistles and shouts. The name comes from a Nahuatl word for old, worn-out clothing. The event spread to other municipalities. It became popular enough among participants and spectators alike to be organized formally in 1871, when it became a traditional way to celebrate the days just before Lent, or the Sunday, Monday, and Tuesday of Carnival. The tradition spread to Tepoztlan, where it became even more famous after the people there modified the clothing worn, adding masks with beards and large mustaches. The dance there was renamed "Chinelos". This new version became a fixture at the carnaval of Yautepec and other towns in Morelos as well.

=== International presence in Cuernavaca ===
Cuernavaca has been a getaway, especially for the well-to-do, since Aztec times. This has continued to the 21st century, with many of these residents including artists, intellectuals, and film stars. María Félix, a Mexican diva, had an opulent, cobalt-blue and papaya-colored villa on Avenida Palmira, along with five other houses. It is known as the Casa de las Tortugas (House of the Turtles) and has Louis XV beds, is adorned with silk brocades, Venetian mosaics, Talavera urns, marble fireplaces, sixteenth-century Spanish armor, Italian gilded chairs, and portraits of her created by Antoine Tzapoff.

U.S. Ambassador and businessman Dwight Morrow had a weekend house called Casa Mañana on the street that bears his name downtown. Morrow commissioned the artist Diego Rivera to paint the murals of the Palacio de Cortes. Today the restaurant La India Bonita is housed there. The restaurant is named for Concepción Sedano, the legendary mistress of Emperor Maximilia I. There is a painting of Maximilian and Concepcion by Taracena in the City Museum. You can also see Rivera murals at the restaurant Casa Rivera, which was once the home of the Mexican actor Mario Moreno Cantinflas. The restaurant is on Juarez, across from the Palacio de Cortes.

The legalization of gambling for a short time in the 1930s attracted Hollywood stars and mobsters from the United States. Cuernavaca was the setting of Malcolm Lowry's Under the Volcano written in 1947. It is a tale of despair and self-destruction due to alcoholism. In the 1950s and 1960s, the city attracted many directors, producers, and actors from Hollywood, many of whom had been blacklisted through the influence of McCarthyism.

Cuernavaca became the host of the CIDOC (Centro Intercultural de Documentación) in 1961, a Catholic institution that indoctrinated priests from developed countries before they were deployed elsewhere in Latin America. CIDOC's lasting reputation was assured by its founding director Ivan Illich, though it closed, "a victim of its own success", ten years later under right-wing political pressure. In the 1960s, the city became one of the centers of the psychedelic movement, attracting many artists, composers, and hippies. Another infamous resident was Sam "Momo" Giancana, a mafia boss associated with the Saint Valentine's Day Massacre in Chicago, made Cuernavaca his home from 1967 until his arrest and deportation in 1974.

Gene Gauntier, actress and scenarist of silent film, spent the rest of her life in Cuernavaca. She lived in her sister's home, Marguerite Wenner-Gren, wife of Swedish millionaire Axel Wenner-Gren who owned a hacienda in Rancho Cortés (today Hotel Racquet). Gauntier died in 1966. Racquet Club (English) retrieved Dec 16, 2018

The trend continues today, with a large number of retirees, diplomats, business executives, royalty, and government officials living in Cuernavaca from all over the world. Many of these foreign residents have formed active expatriate groups, such as the Cuernavaca Newcomers Club to offer get-togethers and advice for its members and newcomers to the city. Services for foreign residents include a large network of English-speaking doctors, foreign mass media via satellite, and ATMs networked to U.S. banks.

The deposed Shah of Iran, Mohammad Reza Pahlavi lived for a short time in Cuernavaca in 1979. His move was arranged by David Rockefeller of Chase Manhattan Bank. The Iran hostage crisis was set off when he moved to New York City for medical treatment.

Princess Maria Beatrice of Savoy, the youngest daughter of King Umberto II of Italy, lived in Colonia Acapantzingo, Cuernavaca with her husband and Luis Reyna and their three children from 1971 until his murder on 17 February 1999.

Cuernavaca has attracted Hollywood production with parts of the 1969 film Butch Cassidy and the Sundance Kid being shot in Tlayacapan north of the city, and parts of the classic 1979 comedy The In-Laws, starring Alan Arkin and Peter Falk, being filmed there. In 1984, John Huston shot Under the Volcano from Malcolm Lowry's novel, with Albert Finney and Jacqueline Bisset in Colonia Acapantzingo, Cuernavaca and in Yautepec de Zaragoza.

== The municipality ==
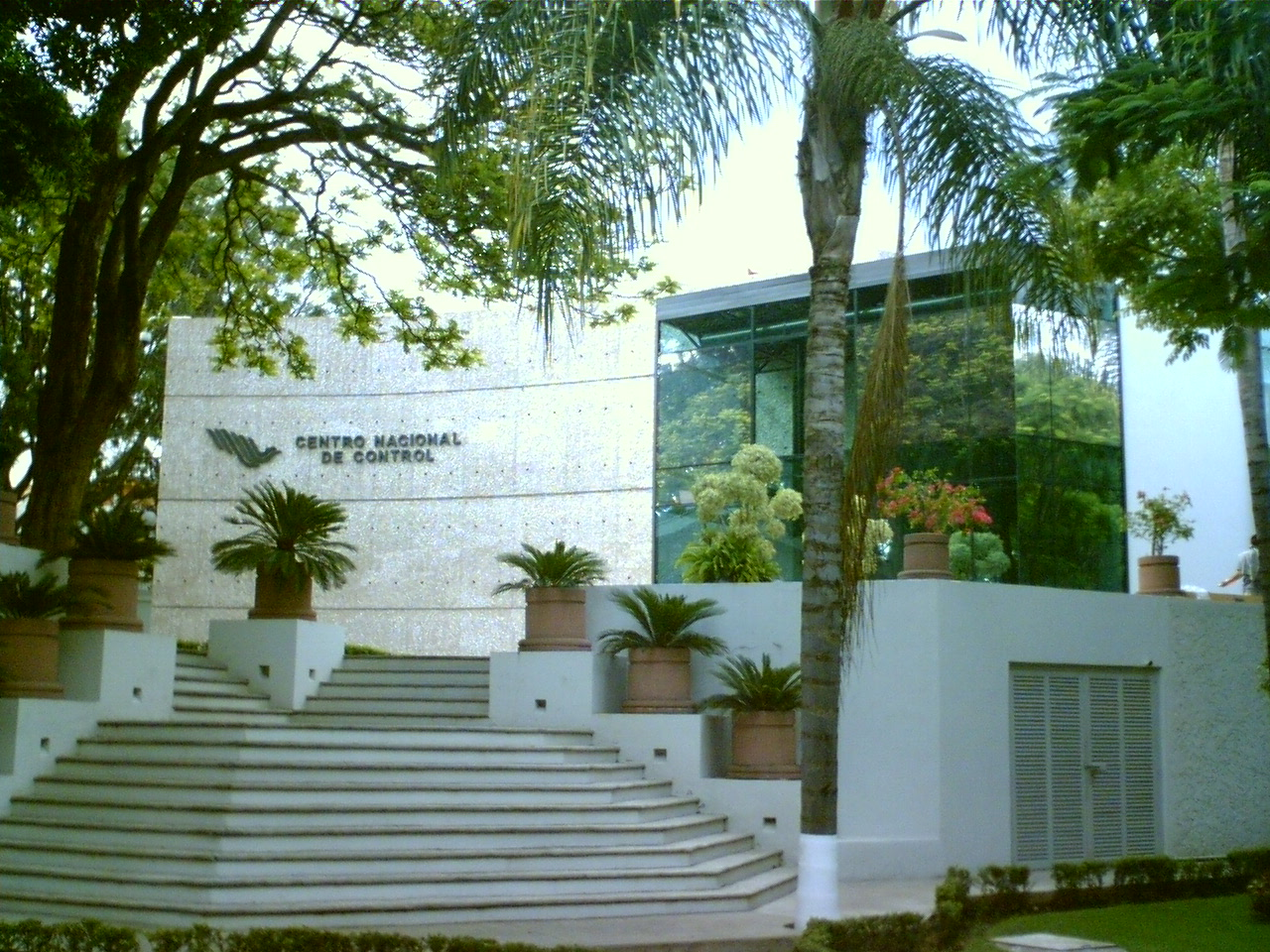
National Control Center office in Cuernavaca

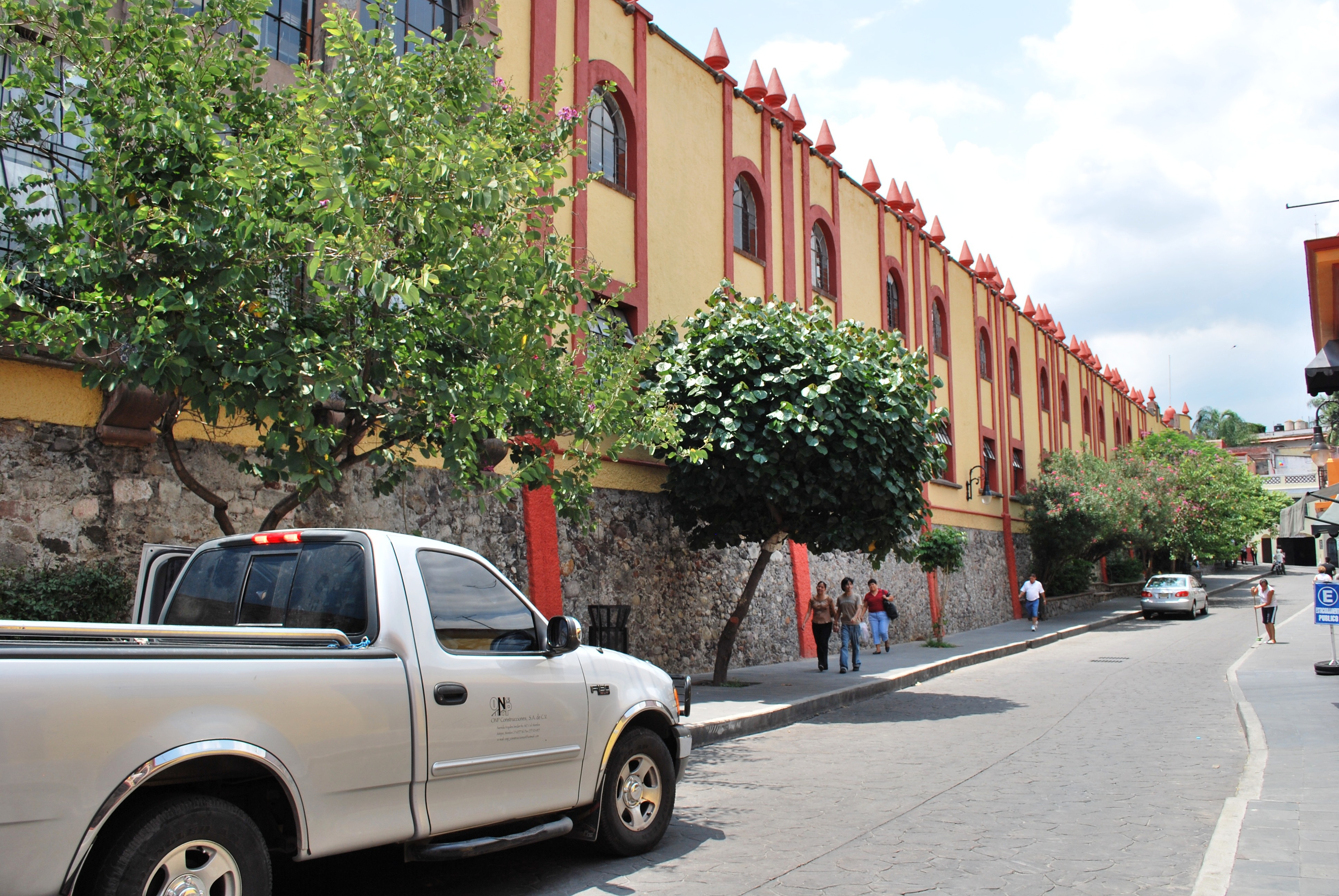
A typical street

Cuernavaca is composed of 12 towns: Acapantzingo, Ahuatepec, Amatitlan, Buenavista del Monte, Chamilpa, Chapultepec, Chipitlan, Ocotepec, San Anton Analco, Santa Maria Ahuacatitlan, Tetela del Monte, and Tlaltenango. As municipal seat of Morelos, the city of Cuernavaca has governing jurisdiction over 142 other communities. The municipality is located in the northeast portion of the State of Morelos and borders the municipalities of Huitzilac, Temixco, Miacatlán, Tepoztlán, Zapata and Jiutepec. The municipalities of Cuernavaca, Emiliano Zapata, Huitzilac, Jiutepec, Temixco, Tepoztlan, and Xochitepec make up the Cuernavaca Metropolitan Area.

In the 2005 census, the municipality had only 3,041 are counted as speaking an indigenous language. In 2015 the municipality's population was 366,321. The city of Cuernavaca is located in the southern portion of the area of the municipality. Urban development covers about 38%, which is the city of Cuernavaca and a few suburbs.

=== Geography ===
The municipality is located between the Trans-Mexican Volcanic Belt in the north and the Sierra Madre del Sur in the south, in a sub-mountain range named the Sierra del Chichinautzin. The municipality contains an area of 151.2 square kilometres (58.4 square miles); 5,668 hectares (14,010 acres) is dedicated to agriculture, 8,227 ha (20,330 acres) for fishing, 5,400 ha (13,000 acres) is developed, and 1,390 ha (3,400 acres) is forest. The average altitude is 2,200 metres (7,200 feet) above sea level, varying between 1,255 and 2,355 metres (4,117 and 7,726 feet). The highest elevations are in the east and north.

==== Rivers and streams ====
During the rainy season, rivers are formed in the ravines of Minaltepec, Ajomulco, Los Caldos (with the San Anton Falls), Los Pocitos, 'El Pollo and El Chiflón; together they form the Cuernavaca River. The riverbeds of Tepoztitlán and Mexicana form the Río Tembembe.

Other streams are in the gulch of las Canoas (which crosses Tetela del Monte and joins the Atzingo), the Tecolote (which forms the San Anton waterfall), the Amanalco (which drains in the Río Apatlaco), the Otates, the Santa Úrsula (which drains into the Río Tetlama), and the Muerto (which begins in Ahuatepec and crosses Flores Magón). The springs in Cuernavaca are: Los Atzingo, el túnel de Santa María, Sanguijuela, Huitzilac, Axomulco, and Chapultepec. The municipality is located in the Amacuzac River Basin.

=== Notable municipal presidents ===
Since 1929 the city has had 50 mayors, including:

- (1955–1956): Felipe Rivera Crespo (Note: Governor of Morelos (1955–1956) and (1970–1976))
- (1997–2000): Sergio Estrada Cajigal Ramírez. Estrada Cajigal was elected governor of Morelos in 2000. His was the first time an opposition candidate (PAN) won.
- (2003–2006): Adrián Rivera Pérez (PAN). Federal senator 2006–2012.
- (2006–2009): Jesús Giles Sánchez (PAN). Federal deputy 2009–2012.
- (2011–2012): Rogelio Sánchez Gatica (PRI). He was charged with stealing $154 million pesos.
- (2012–2015): Jorge Morales Barud (PRI). Governor of Morelos (1998–2000).
- (2015–2018): Cuauhtémoc Blanco (PSD). Resigned to run for governor of Morelos in 2018 and elected in July 2018 (Morena).
- (2019–2021): Francisco Antonio Villalobos Adán (Morena). (Note: Villalobos was chosen as a substitute candidate after the original candidate of his party, José Luis Gómez Borbolla, had his registration canceled. After winning the July 2018 election, Villalobos Adan's house was shot at in October, so he decided to stay out of the spotlight from November 2018 until he took office on 1 January 2019, citing threats on his life.)

== Geography ==
=== Climate ===
Cuernavaca has a tropical savanna climate (Köppen climate classification Aw) bordering on a humid subtropical climate (Köppen climate classification Cwa), with temperatures that are moderated by its altitude. The warmest month is May with an average temperature of 23.5 °C (74.3 °F) and the coolest month is January with an average of 18.7 °C (65.7 °F). The municipality has two distinct climates. In the north, is a temperate climate that is somewhat moist with rain predominantly in the summer. That area is covered in forests of pine and oak. In the south, is a tropical climate that is warmer with the same moisture pattern. The southern area is primarily grassland with some rainforest. Average annual temperature is 20.9 °C (70 °F) with the warmest months being April and May and the coolest being January and December. Temperatures only occasionally exceed 34 °C (93 °F) or fall below 10 °C (50 °F).

Climate data for Cuernavaca (1951–2010)
Month	Jan	Feb	Mar	Apr	May	Jun	Jul	Aug	Sep	Oct	Nov	Dec	Year
Record high °C (°F)	31.5 (88.7)	37.0 (98.6)	36.0 (96.8)	39.5 (103.1)	39.8 (103.6)	39.4 (102.9)	34.0 (93.2)	33.5 (92.3)	31.5 (88.7)	36.0 (96.8)	31.0 (87.8)	34.0 (93.2)	39.8 (103.6)
Mean daily maximum °C (°F)	25.2 (77.4)	26.5 (79.7)	28.8 (83.8)	30.1 (86.2)	29.7 (85.5)	27.1 (80.8)	26.2 (79.2)	26.1 (79.0)	25.1 (77.2)	25.9 (78.6)	25.8 (78.4)	25.2 (77.4)	26.8 (80.2)
Daily mean °C (°F)	18.7 (65.7)	19.9 (67.8)	21.9 (71.4)	23.3 (73.9)	23.5 (74.3)	22.0 (71.6)	21.1 (70.0)	21.0 (69.8)	20.4 (68.7)	20.4 (68.7)	19.7 (67.5)	18.9 (66.0)	20.9 (69.6)
Mean daily minimum °C (°F)	12.2 (54.0)	13.3 (55.9)	15.0 (59.0)	16.6 (61.9)	17.3 (63.1)	16.8 (62.2)	16.0 (60.8)	15.9 (60.6)	15.7 (60.3)	14.9 (58.8)	13.7 (56.7)	12.7 (54.9)	15.0 (59.0)
Record low °C (°F)	3.0 (37.4)	5.0 (41.0)	6.5 (43.7)	10.0 (50.0)	11.0 (51.8)	10.0 (50.0)	11.0 (51.8)	10.0 (50.0)	10.0 (50.0)	9.0 (48.2)	3.0 (37.4)	5.0 (41.0)	3.0 (37.4)
Average precipitation mm (inches)	13.6 (0.54)	7.2 (0.28)	5.6 (0.22)	15.5 (0.61)	57.7 (2.27)	250.9 (9.88)	266.7 (10.50)	268.1 (10.56)	256.3 (10.09)	100.2 (3.94)	16.7 (0.66)	5.2 (0.20)	1,263.7 (49.75)
Average precipitation days (≥ 0.1 mm)	1.3	1.3	1.3	3.3	8.6	18.8	20.7	21.0	20.0	9.7	2.4	1.1	109.5
Average relative humidity (%)	51	47	39	40	48	62	68	67	73	68	60	56	57
Mean monthly sunshine hours	277	271	293	276	263	209	239	219	189	237	268	270	3,011
Source 1: Servicio Meteorologico Nacional (humidity 1981–2000)
Source 2: Deutscher Wetterdienst (sun, 1961–1990) (Note: Station ID for Cuernavaca, Mor. is 76726 Use this station ID to locate the sunshine duration)

== Economy ==
Most of the economic activity in the municipality is retail trade, concentrated in and around the city of Cuernavaca. Agriculture and fish farming employ the fewest people, although the municipality contains a good quantity of resources for these enterprises. The far north of the municipality generally is not suited to agriculture, due to the terrain and types of volcanic soil found there. Most agriculture is concentrated in the southeast. The lower elevations, at around 1,800 metres (5,900 feet), is best-suited for fishing and fish-farming. The middle range, between 1,800 and 2,100 metres (5,900 and 6,900 feet), has uses mixed between agriculture and forest products, and the elevations higher than 2,100 metres (6,900 feet) are primarily forest. Fish farming areas are under pressure from urban development, especially in the Ahuatepec region east of the city, where irregular and sometimes illegal, housing developments are appearing among the farms.

On the outskirts of Cuernavaca, there are a handful of plant nurseries, specializing in the planting, growing and distribution, including international shipments, of plants, flowers and seeds. Many famous gardens around the world are supplied with flowers from the Cuernavaca region.

Industry is minimal and mostly limited to micro-industries such as printing, framing, ceramics, garment-making, and the production of cleaning supplies. This employs about 28% of the population. Most of the population (67%) is employed in the retail and service industries, both dependent on tourism.

Crafts from this area primarily consist of ceramics and wax products. The wax used is from bees and generally it is shaped into capricious figures. Flowerpots and clay objects from San Antón, handcrafted paper from wood chips with multicolored paintings, and wood lacquered masks are other products of the municipality.

== Education ==
There are many private elementary (grades 1-6), middle (grades 7-9), and high schools (grades 10-12) in Cuernavaca. Below are the elementary and middle schools that did the best on the government standard exam Enlace. in 2009. (NOTE: The list is for the State of Morelos. The Enlace tests Spanish language and math ability, but it does not test English.)

Elementary schools

1. Ingles de Cuernavaca (private) 2. Huitzilac (private) 3. ABC (private) 4. Montessori (private) There are several schools that follow the teachings of Maria Montessori in the city, but the article does not say which one is included here. 5. Colegio Mundo Feliz (private) 6. Colegio Tehatsi (private) 7. Colegio Hamilton of Cuernavaca (private) 8. Olinca (private) 9. Niños Heroes (public) 10. Dorados (private)

Middle schools 1. Colegio Tehatsi (private) 2. Centro Educativo Cocoyoc (private) 3. Dorados (private) 4. Colegio Boston (private) 5. Nezahuacoyotl (telesecundaria) 6. Helen Keller (private) 7. Colegio Williams of Cuernavaca (private) 8. Miraflores de Cuernavaca (private) 9. Martires Agraristas (telesecundaria) 10. Olinca de Cuernavaca (private)

High schools There are no standardized tests for high school students. The following schools offer bilingual (Spanish-English) programs at the high-school level:

- Colegio Marymount, Colonia Rancho Tetela American-style high school that offers a complete programs in English and French.
- Colegio Williams de Cuernavaca, Colonia Flores Magon EFL program that offers advanced Cambridge University certification and French certification.
- Preparatoria de Colegio Boston, Colonia Chapultepec
- Universidad Tecmilenio (Lomas de Cuernavaca, Temixco)
- Tecnologico de Monterrey (Temixco) American-style high school that offers two bilingual (English-Spanish) programs, depending on level.
- Loyola Grupo Educativo de Cuernavaca

Universities serving Cuernavaca

- The National Autonomous University of Mexico (Spanish: Universidad Nacional Autónoma de México), UNAM maintains a campus in Cuernavaca.
- The Autonomous University of the State of Morelos (Spanish: Universidad Autonoma del Estado de Morelos (UAEM). The university has an exchange program.
- Universidad Mexicana de Educación a Distancia (UMED)
- Friar Luca Paccioli University (Spanish: Universidad Fray Luca Paccioli (UFLP)
- Universidad del Valle de Cuernavaca (UVNIVAC)
- Universidad Interamericana, Campus Cuernavaca
- Universidad Privada del Estado de Morelos (UPEM)
- Universidad Americana de Morelos
- Cuauhnáhuac, Campus Lomas de Cuernavaca (UNIC)
- Universidad Loyola de Cuernavaca
- Centro Universidad Aztlán Campuses in Cuernavaca, Cuautla, Jiutepec

Spanish for foreigners

Cuernavaca has a long tradition of schools that teach Spanish to foreigners. Generally, they offer intensive classes (3–5 hours or more daily), starting with a duration of one week. Many schools offer tours and cultural activities, and they can usually help students with housing.

- Cemanuac Spanish School, Calle San Juan No. 3, Colonia Las Palmas Sur, http://www.cemanahuacspanishschool.com/
- Escuela de Español para Extranjeros, Colonia Prado
- Kukulcan Educational Spanish Community
- Centro de Lengua Arte E Historia Para Extranjeros,
- Universidad Internacional Cuernavaca
- Ideal Spanish Language School
- Spanish Language Institute
- Linguatec Cuernavaca
- Anders Languages

== International relations ==
=== Twin towns – sister cities ===
Cuernavaca is twinned with cities in the USA and Japan:

- Minneapolis, Minnesota
- New York, New York
- Denver, Colorado
- Ōtaki, Chiba, Japan
- Minoh, Osaka, Japan

== Popular culture ==
Novels set in Cuernavaca

- Under the Volcano by Malcolm Lowry.
- Please Write For Details by John D. MacDonald
- Profunda Retaguardia: Novela de Cuernavaca by Spanish poet José Herrera Petere.
- Cuernavaca by Richard W Perhacs ISBN 1493785265 & ISBN 978-1493785261.
- Zami: A New Spelling of My Name by Audre Lorde is partly set in Cuernavaca.

Songs in English that reference Cuernavaca

- "Veracruz" by Warren Zevon.
- "Cuernavaca Choo Choo" by Bob Crewe and Frank Slay (Swan 1959).

Songs in Spanish that reference Cuernavaca:

- "La Feria de la Flor" by Mariachi Vargas de Tecalitlan
- "Los Chanates" by Régulo Caro (2014)
- "Que Rechula Es Katy" by Juan Gabriel (1997)
- "Al Que Fue Mi Apa" by La Estructura (2014)
- "El Desconocido" by Larry Hernandez & Gerardo Ortiz (2015)
- "El Adios De Botas Blancas" by Los Hijos De Barron (2016)
- "Pulque, Mescal y Tequila" by Thiéfaine (2008)
- "Sábado Distrito Federal" by Chava Flores (2005) and by Los Estramboticos (2010)
- "El Vendador Ambulante" by Traviezoz De La Zierra (2016)

Movies set in Cuernavaca

- Under the Volcano, based on the Malcolm Lowry novel, directed by John Huston (1984)
- Cuernavaca directed Alejandro Andrade Pease (2017)
- The Bolivia scenes from Butch Cassidy and the Sundance Kid were filmed in and around Cuernavaca

TV shows set in Cuernavaca

- La Fea Mas Bella, in 3 episodes the pair travel to Cuernavaca.
- The Pretender, in Season 2, Episode 1, part of the plot involves Cuernavaca.
- Buffy the Vampire Slayer, in Season 3, Episode 12, the special abilities of vampire slayer Buffy Summers get chemically suppressed. As her powers decline, Buffy says her "...game's left the country.... It's in Cuernavaca!"

== Transportation ==
The city is 90 minutes by car from Mexico City.

Cuernavaca airport is the commercial airport in the area. It has had, intermittently, airline service from such airlines as the now bankrupt Mexicana and from Aeromexico and VivaAerobus, among others.

== See also ==
- Governors of Morelos
- List of people from Morelos
