= Same-sex marriage in Morelos =

Same-sex marriage has been legal in Morelos since 5 July 2016. A bill to amend the State Constitution to legalize same-sex marriage passed the Congress of Morelos on 18 May 2016 by 20 votes to 6. Ratification by a majority of the state's 33 municipalities was confirmed on 27 June 2016. The law was published in the official state gazette on 4 July 2016, and took effect the following day. Morelos was the ninth Mexican state to legalize same-sex marriage.

== Legal history ==
=== Background ===
The Supreme Court of Justice of the Nation ruled on 12 June 2015 that state bans on same-sex marriage are unconstitutional nationwide. The court's ruling is considered a "jurisprudential thesis" and did not invalidate state laws, meaning that same-sex couples denied the right to marry would still have to seek individual amparos in court. The ruling standardized the procedures for judges and courts throughout Mexico to approve all applications for same-sex marriages and made the approval mandatory. Specifically, the court ruled that bans on same-sex marriage violate Articles 1 and 4 of the Constitution of Mexico. Article 1 of the Constitution states:

Any form of discrimination, based on ethnic or national origin, gender, age, disabilities, social status, medical conditions, religion, opinions, sexual orientation, marital status, or any other form, which violates the human dignity or seeks to annul or diminish the rights and freedoms of the people, is prohibited. (Note: In some official and indigenous languages of Morelos: Spanish: Queda prohibida toda discriminación motivada por origen étnico o nacional, el género, la edad, las discapacidades, la condición social, las condiciones de salud, la religión, las opiniones, las preferencias sexuales, el estado civil o cualquier otra que atente contra la dignidad humana y tenga por objeto anular o menoscabar los derechos y libertades de las personas.; Nahuatl: Majmauilo nochi tlaixpinaualistli ika maseualtsitsi katli euani tomexkotlali, siuatl uan tlakatl, ininxiui, uan katli amo ueli motekipanolia, maseualmej, melauatlajkayotl, teotlanejnewili, tlatsintokilistli, kualtiloni pakilistli, sanimanyotl nemili o akinijki kichiuas tlaixpanoli ika maseual tlaixpinauali uan kipia tamantli tlaixkotonali o tlaijtlakoli tlen tlamelaualistli uan tlamakixtiistli ika maseualmej.)

On 28 August 2013, a same-sex couple, José Almanza Luna and Heriberto Álvarez López, filed an amparo seeking the right to marry. The amparo was granted by a judge of the Second District Court in January 2014, who ordered the civil registry office in Xochitepec to process the marriage application. The couple married on 17 May 2014. In January 2014, another same-sex couple began the process and in July were granted permission to marry. After losing an appeal, the registrar performed the marriage ceremony in Ciudad Ayala on 6 September 2014. Marquez Edgar Ortega, director of Attention to Sexual Diversity (Atención a la Diversidad Sexual), announced at the wedding that six more amparos for same-sex marriage rights had been requested in Morelos. On 29 October 2014, a lesbian couple from Cuernavaca were granted the right to divorce, after a court recognized their marriage.

=== Early bills ===
Bills to legalize same-sex marriage and adoption by same-sex couples in Morelos were first proposed by the Labor Party (PT) in January 2010. The proposal was opposed by the conservative National Action Party (PAN), and rejected in February 2010. A subsequent proposal was also rejected in March 2013. The Party of the Democratic Revolution (PRD) announced in July 2014 that a vote on a measure to legalize same-sex marriage would occur in September 2014. On 19 September 2014, civil society organizations, including the Sexual Diversity March in Morelos (Marcha de la Diversidad Sexual en Morelos), launched impeachment procedures against members of the Committee on Constitutional Issues for failing to debate the same-sex marriage legislation. The impeachment filing noted that the same-sex marriage bill had been in committee for 20 months, even though the committee is legally required to submit its recommendations to Congress within 60 days.

=== Passage of legislation in 2016 ===
Map showing how each municipality voted on the 2016 constitutional amendment Yes No Abstain (validated as "Yes")

On 27 July 2015, Governor Graco Ramírez introduced legislation to Congress to legalize same-sex marriages. The proposal sought to reform Article 120 of the Constitution of Morelos and articles 22, 65 and 68 of the Family Code to bring them in line with jurisprudence set by the Supreme Court on 12 June 2015, when it ruled that bans on same-sex marriage are unconstitutional nationwide.

On 18 May 2016, the Congress of Morelos voted 20 to 6 to approve the constitutional change to legalize same-sex marriage. Governor Ramírez welcomed the approval of the bill. Ratification by at least 17 of the state's 33 municipalities was required for the constitutional amendment to take effect. The municipalities had until 25 June 2016 to act on the proposed change. If they failed to act by that date, they were deemed to have consented to the amendment under the principle of "constructive assent" (afirmativa ficta). At the end of the process, a total of 17 municipalities had ratified the constitutional change and 15 had voted against ratification, while 1 municipality was awarded an extra week, although the clear majority being in favor meant that same-sex marriage would become legal in the state. The municipalities that voted in favor of the reform were Cuautla, Emiliano Zapata, Huitzilac, Jantetelco, Jiutepec, Puente de Ixtla, Temixco, Tetecala, Tlaquiltenango, Totolapan, Yautepec de Zaragoza and Yecapixtla. Additionally, the municipalities of Axochiapan, Cuernavaca, Mazatepec, Tepalcingo and Tlayacapan did not vote and were therefore deemed to have assented to the amendment. The law was promulgated and published in the state's official gazette on 4 July 2016. It took effect on 5 July. The state adoption agency clarified that the law allows same-sex couples to adopt jointly as the adoption process is open to all spouses in Morelos. Article 120 of the Constitution of Morelos now reads: Marriage is the voluntary union of two people, with equal rights and obligations, with the purpose of building a shared life and helping one another. (Note: Spanish: El matrimonio es la unión voluntaria de dos personas, con igualdad de derechos y obligaciones, con el propósito de desarrollar una comunidad de vida y ayudarse mutuamente.)

18 May 2016 vote in the Congress
Party	Voted for	Voted against	Abstained	Absent (Did not vote)
Party of the Democratic Revolution	8: Ricardo Calvo Huerta; Rodolfo Domínguez Alarcón; Hortencia Figueroa Peralta; Enrique Laffitte Bretón; Javier Montes Rosales; Francisco Navarrete Conde; Anacleto Pedraza Flores; Éder Rodríguez Casillas	–	–	–
Institutional Revolutionary Party	4: Mario Chávez Ortega; Alberto Martínez Gonzalez; Francisco Moreno Merino; Aristeo Rodríguez Barrera	–	–	2: Leticia Beltrán Caballero; Beatriz Vicera Alatriste
National Action Party	–	5: Carlos Alanís Romero; Víctor Manuel Caballero; Emmanuel Mojica Linares; Norma Popoca Sotelo; José Tablas Pimentel	–	–
New Alliance Party	2: Edith Beltrán Carrillo; Julio Espín Navarrete	–	–	1: Francisco Santillán Arredondo
Ecologist Green Party of Mexico	1: Silvia Irra Marín	–	–	1: Faustino Estrada González
Citizens' Movement	1: Jaime Álvarez Cisneros	–	–	–
Humanist Party	1: Jesús Escamilla Casarrubias	–	–	–
Labor Party	1: Edwin Brito Brito	–	–	–
National Regeneration Movement	1: Manuel Nava Amores	–	–	–
Social Democratic Party	1: Julio Yáñez Moreno	–	–	–
Social Encounter Party	–	1: Efraín Mondragón Corrales	–	–
Total	20	6	0	4
Total	66.7%	20.0%	0.0%	13.3%

On 29 August 2016, 17 municipalities filed a constitutional challenge with the Supreme Court seeking to overturn the same-sex marriage reform. They argued that the Congress of Morelos had "acted illegally" when it validated the amendment. Officials in 2 municipalities (Mazatepec and Tepalcingo) stated that their positions had been treated as "constructive assent", even though they had reportedly voted against the reform. The Supreme Court dismissed the challenge on 8 September 2016.

== Marriage statistics ==
The following table shows the number of same-sex marriages performed in Morelos since legalization in 2016 as reported by the National Institute of Statistics and Geography.

Number of marriages performed in Morelos
Year	Same-sex			Opposite-sex	Total	% same-sex
Year	Female	Male	Total	Opposite-sex	Total	% same-sex
2016	20	22	42	8,113	8,155	0.52%
2017	35	38	73	8,132	8,205	0.89%
2018	90	54	144	7,691	7,835	1.84%
2019	74	47	121	7,211	7,332	1.65%
2020	76	47	123	5,929	6,052	2.03%
2021	88	62	150	6,960	7,110	2.11%
2022	134	87	221	7,869	8,090	2.73%
2023	108	63	171	8,150	8,321	2.06%
2024	85	58	143	8,037	8,180	1.75%

== Public opinion ==
A 2017 opinion poll conducted by the Strategic Communication Office (Gabinete de Comunicación Estratégica) found that 51% of Morelos residents supported same-sex marriage, while 45% were opposed. According to a 2018 survey by the National Institute of Statistics and Geography, 38.5% of the Morelos public opposed same-sex marriage.

== See also ==
- Same-sex marriage in Mexico
- LGBT rights in Mexico
