= 2nd federal electoral district of Morelos =

Federal electoral district of Mexico

Morelos's 2nd
- Electoral district of the Chamber of Deputies of Mexico

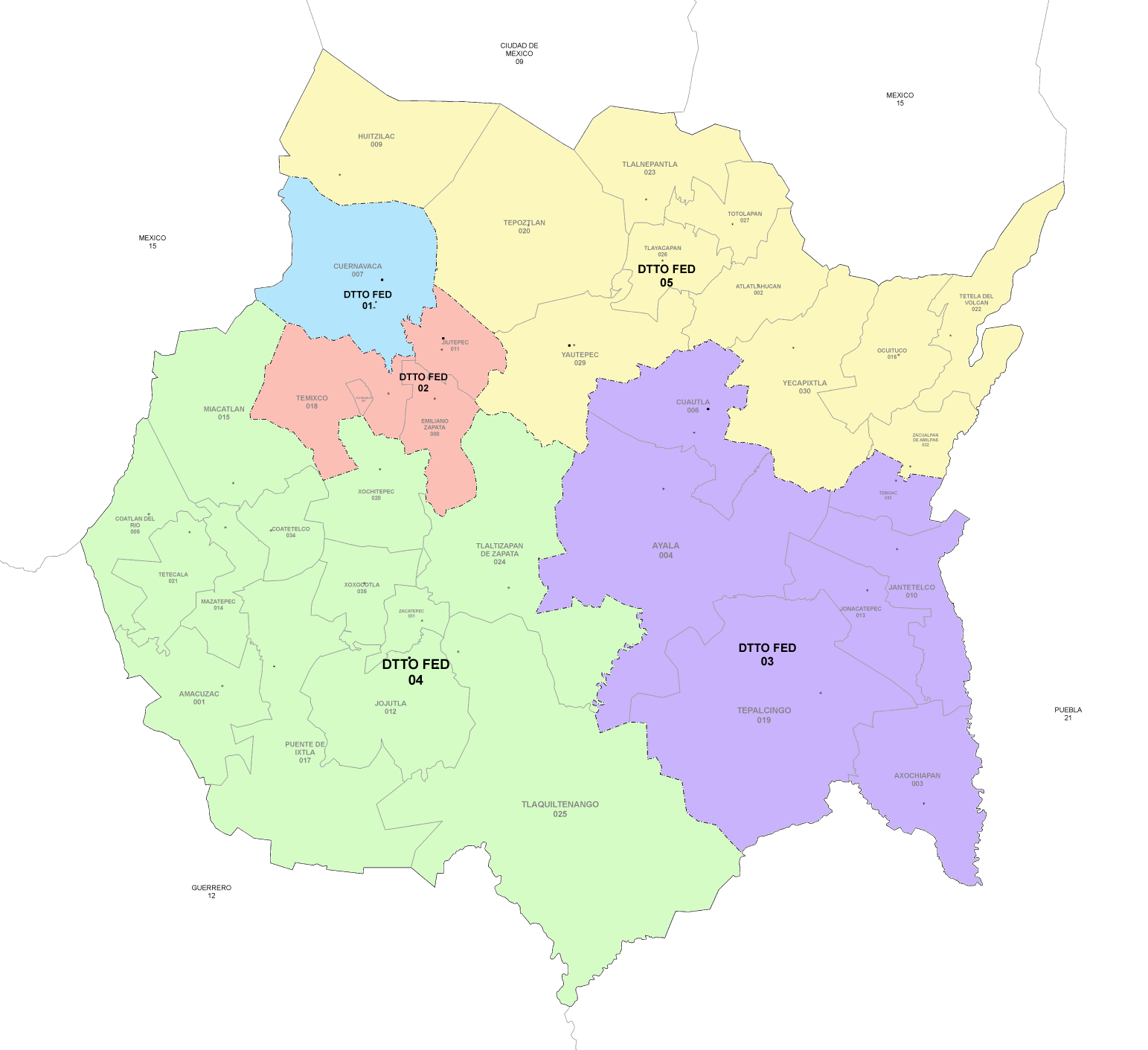
- 2nd district

Incumbent
- Member: Ariadna Barrera Vázquez
- Party: ▌Morena
- Congress: 66th (2024–2027)

District
- State: Morelos
- Head town: Jiutepec
- Coordinates: 18°53′N 99°10′W
- Covers: Cuernavaca (part), Emiliano Zapata, Jiutepec, Temixco
- PR region: Fourth
- Precincts: 145
- Population: 446,815 (2020 census)

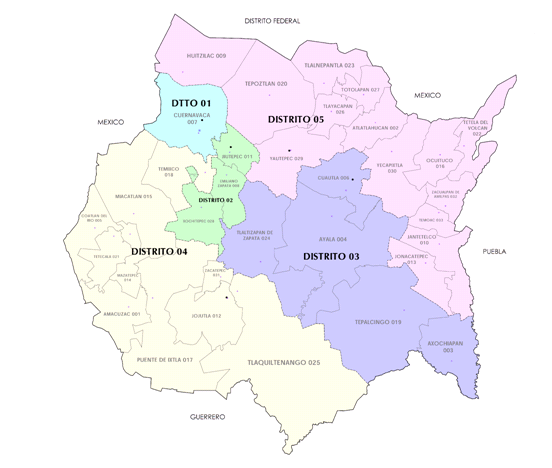
Morelos under the 2017–2022 districting plan

The 2nd federal electoral district of Morelos (Spanish: Distrito electoral federal 02 de Morelos) is one of the 300 electoral districts into which Mexico is divided for elections to the federal Chamber of Deputies and one of five such districts in the state of Morelos.

It elects one deputy to the lower house of Congress for each three-year legislative period by means of the first-past-the-post system. Votes cast in the district also count towards the calculation of proportional representation ("plurinominal") deputies elected from the fourth region.

The current member for the district, elected in the 2024 general election, is Ariadna Barrera Vázquez of the National Regeneration Movement (Morena).

== District territory ==
Under the 2023 districting plan adopted by the National Electoral Institute (INE), which is to be used for the 2024, 2027 and 2030 federal elections, the 2nd district comprises 145 precincts (secciones electorales) in the municipalities of Emiliano Zapata, Jiutepec and Temixco, together with the exclave of the municipality of Cuernavaca known as la Isla that is surrounded by Temixco.

The head town (cabecera distrital), where results from individual polling stations are gathered together and tallied, is the city of Jiutepec. The district reported a population of 446,815 in the 2020 census.

== Previous districting schemes ==
Evolution of electoral district numbers
	1974	1978	1996	2005	2017	2023
Morelos	2	4	4	5	5	5
Chamber of Deputies	196	300				

2017–2022

Under the scheme in force from 2017 to 2022, the 2nd district comprised the whole of Emiliano Zapata, Jiutepec and Xochitepec, plus Cuernavaca's two exclave precincts. The head town was at Jiutepec.

2005–2017

Under the 2005 plan, which gave Morelos its fifth congressional seat, the district covered the whole of Emiliano Zapata, Jiutepec and Temixco, plus Cuernavaca's two exclave precincts. The head town was at Jiutepec.

1996–2005

In the 1996 scheme, the district's head town was at Yautepec and it comprised nine municipalities:
- Atlatlahucan, Emiliano Zapata, Jiutepec, Temixco, Tepoztlán, Tlalnepantla, Tlayacapan, Totolapan and Yautepec.

1978–1996

The districting scheme in force from 1978 to 1996 was the result of the 1977 electoral reforms, which increased the number of single-member seats in the Chamber of Deputies from 196 to 300. Under that plan, Morelos's seat allocation rose from two to four. The 2nd district covered eight municipalities:
- Axochiapan, Ayala, Cuautla, Jantetelco, Jonacatepec, Temoac, Tepalcingo and Zacualpan de Amilpas.

== Deputies returned to Congress ==
(Mexico) National parties
- Current
- PAN
- PRI
- PT
- PVEM
- MC
- Morena
- PAZ
- Somos
- Defunct or local only
- PLM
- PNR
- PRM
- PNM
- PP
- PPS
- PARM
- PFCRN
- CON
- PANAL
- PSD
- PES
- PES
- PRD

Morelos's 2nd district
Election	Deputy	Party	Term	Legislature
1916	José L. Gómez		1916–1917	Constituent Congress of Querétaro
...
1973	Roque González Urriza	Institutional Revolutionary Party	1973–1976	49th Congress
1976	Filomeno López Rea	Institutional Revolutionary Party	1976–1979	50th Congress
1979	Francisco Pliego Nava	Institutional Revolutionary Party	1979–1982	51st Congress
1982	Heladio Gutiérrez Ortega	Institutional Revolutionary Party	1982–1985	52nd Congress
1985	Raúl Ramírez Chávez	Institutional Revolutionary Party	1985–1988	53rd Congress
1988	Saturnino Solano Pérez	Institutional Revolutionary Party	1988–1991	54th Congress
1991	Julio Gómez Herrera	Institutional Revolutionary Party	1991–1994	55th Congress
1994	Raúl Ramírez Chávez	Institutional Revolutionary Party	1994–1997	56th Congress
1997	Anastasio Solís Lezo	Party of the Democratic Revolution	1997–2000	57th Congress
2000	Gumercindo Álvarez Sotelo	National Action Party (Mexico)	2000–2003	58th Congress
2003	Rodolfo Esquivel Landa	National Action Party (Mexico)	2003–2006	59th Congress
2006	Demetrio Román Isidoro	National Action Party (Mexico)	2006–2009	60th Congress
2009	José Manuel Agüero Tovar	Institutional Revolutionary Party	2009–2012	61st Congress
2012	Javier Orihuela García	Party of the Democratic Revolution	2012–2015	62nd Congress
2015	Héctor Javier García Chávez	National Regeneration Movement	2015–2018	63rd Congress
2018	Alejandra Pani Barragán	National Regeneration Movement	2018–2021	64th Congress
2021	Alejandra Pani Barragán	National Regeneration Movement	2021–2024	65th Congress
2024	Ariadna Barrera Vázquez	National Regeneration Movement	2024–2027	66th Congress

== Presidential elections ==
Morelos's 2nd district
Election	District won by	Party or coalition	%
2018	Andrés Manuel López Obrador	Juntos Haremos Historia	62.9833
2024	Claudia Sheinbaum Pardo	Sigamos Haciendo Historia	61.8391
