= Tanalís Padilla =

Latin Americanist historian

Tanalís Padilla (born in Mexico City) is a Mexican-American Latin Americanist professor and historian specializing in 20th-century Mexican social and political movements. She is currently employed at the Massachusetts Institute of Technology and is the author of Rural Resistance in the Land of Zapata (2008) and Unintended Lessons of Revolution (2021).

== Career ==
She was born in Mexico City, but spent most of her childhood in Tapaxco. Her parents were Marxists and her mother was a teacher. After finishing elementary school, her family immigrated to Culver City, California. In 1991, she graduated valedictorian from Culver City High School.

In 1995, she got her bachelor's degree at Pomona College; entering her undergraduate program there expecting to pursue political science or international relations, her history classes under Sidney Lemelle and Miguel Tinker Salas at Pomona and Cindy Forster at Scripps College shaped her worldview. Consequently, she switched her major to history. In 1998, she achieved her master's degree at the University of California, San Diego, obtaining her PhD from there in 2001. Her doctoral thesis was on Mexican agrarista Rubén Jaramillo, whose movement she dedicated her first book to in 2008. She then taught as a visiting professor at Pomona, became a postdoctoral researcher at Yale University, tenured professor at Dartmouth College, and now has been working at MIT since 2015.

In a 25 March 2024 letter regarding the pro-Palestinian protests at MIT she co-signed with Michel DeGraff, she condemned rising antisemitism and accusations of it to suppress free speech. Member to the university's 50-professor Alliance of Concerned Faculty, she participated in the MIT encampment since its establishment in April.

She is currently writing a book on Cuban medical internationalism, which she previously commented on when praising the vaccine during the COVID-19 pandemic.

== Works ==
Additionally co-editing the 2013 special issue of the Journal of Iberian and Latin American Research and contributing to Mexican newspaper La Jornada, her bibliography includes:

- Rural Resistance in the Land of Zapata: The Jaramillista Movement and the Myth of the Pax Priísta, 1940–1962. Durham: Duke University Press. November 2008. ISBN 978-0-8223-4319-6. OCLC 226361824.
- Padilla, Tanalís; Walker, Louise E. (July 2013). "In the Archives: History and Politics". Journal of Iberian and Latin American Research. 19 (1): 1–10. doi:10.1080/13260219.2013.805715. ISSN 1326-0219.
- "Memories of Justice: Rural Normales and the Cardenista Legacy". Mexican Studies/Estudios Mexicanos. 32 (1): 111–143. 2016. doi:10.1525/mex.2016.32.1.111. ISSN 0742-9797. JSTOR 26424880.
- Padilla, Tanalís (2018). ""Latent Sites of Agitation": Normalistas Rurales and Chihuahua's Agrarian Struggle in the 1960s". In Pensado, Jaime M.; Ochoa, Enrique C. (eds.). México Beyond 1968: Revolutionaries, Radicals, and Repression During the Global Sixties and Subversive Seventies. Tucson: University of Arizona Press. pp. 53–72. doi:10.2307/j.ctv2t4cp8.8. ISBN 9780816539086. JSTOR j.ctv2t4cp8.8. OCLC 10017089655. Project MUSE book 59522
- Unintended Lessons of Revolution: Student Teachers and Political Radicalism in Twentieth-Century Mexico. Durham: Duke University Press. 2021. hdl:1721.1/138444. ISBN 978-1-4780-1479-9. OCLC 1240575697.

== See also ==
- Historiography of Latin America
