= Gumercindo Álvarez Sotelo =

Mexican politician

- Born: 13 January 1962 (age 64); Yautepec de Zaragoza, Morelos, Mexico
- Occupation: Politician
- Political party: PAN

Gumercindo Álvarez Sotelo (born 13 January 1962) is a Mexican politician from the National Action Party (PAN). From 2000 to 2003 he served as a federal deputy in the 58th Congress, representing the second district of Morelos.
