= Congress of Morelos =

Legislature of the Mexican state of Morelos

Congress of Morelos Congreso del Estado de Morelos
- LVI Legislature (2024–2027)

Type
- Type: Unicameral

Structure
- Seats: 20 diputados
- Political groups: MORENA (10) PAN (4) PT (2) MC (1) PANAL (1) PRI (1) PVEM (1)
- Length of term: 3 years
- Authority: Political Constitution of the Free and Sovereign State of Morelos
- Salary: MX$62,854 per month

Elections
- Voting system: 12 by first-past-the-post and 8 by proportional representation
- Last election: 2 June 2024
- Next election: 2027

Meeting place
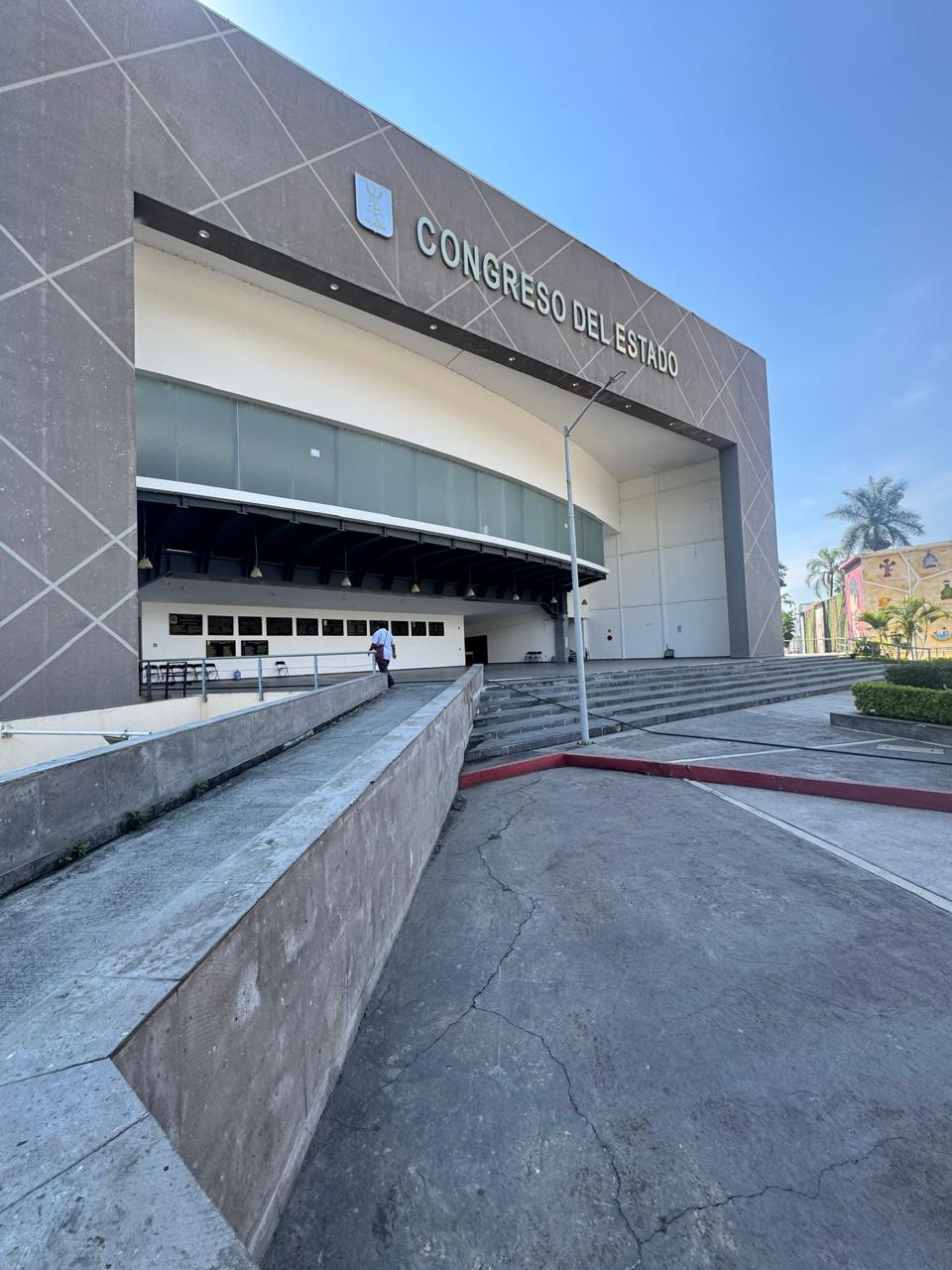
- Cuernavaca, Morelos, Mexico

Website
- congresomorelos.gob.mx

The Congress of Morelos (Spanish: Congreso del Estado de Morelos) is the legislature of the Mexican state of Morelos. It convenes in the state capital, Cuernavaca.

== Structure ==
The Congress of Morelos is unicameral and consists of 20 deputies, called diputados. 12 of them are elected by first-past-the-post in single-member districts (SMDs) and 8 are elected by proportional representation (PR) from state-wide party lists.

Morelos's 12 local electoral districts were determined by the National Electoral Institute (INE) in its 2021–2023 redistricting process. Under that plan, which is to remain in force until 2030, the single-member districts are the following:

District	Seat	Municipalities	Map
1	Cuernavaca	1	
2	Cuernavaca	1	
3	Tlayacapan	6	
4	Yecapixtla	8	
5	Temixco	3	
6	Jiutepec	1	
7	Cuautla	1	
8	Xochitepec	6	
9	Emiliano Zapata	2	
10	Ayala	3	
11	Jojutla	5	
12	Yautepec	2	

In three of the SMDs (3rd, 4th and 8th), Indigenous and Afrodescendent inhabitants account for over 40% of the total population and they are therefore classified by the INE as indigenous districts.

== Powers and authority ==
Title 3 of the state constitution establishes the legal framework within which the Congress of Morelos operates.

- Chapter I sets out the rules for elections and the eligibility of candidates.
- Chapter II governs the installation of Congress and its legislative sessions.
- Chapter III lists the powers invested in Congress.
- Chapter IV describes the procedures to be followed for enacting legislation.
- Chapter V establishes provisions for when Congress is in recess.

== History ==
The state of Morelos, carved out from the much larger state of Mexico, was admitted to the federation on 17 April 1869. The Congress of Morelos first convened on 28 July of that year in the city of Yautepec and, on 16 November, voted to establish the state capital at Cuernavaca.

In its first legislative session (1869–1871), Congress comprised seven deputies elected in seven single-member districts. The number was increased to ten for the 2nd to 4th legislatures (1871–1877) but then reduced to nine for the 1877 election. It remained unchanged until the 1912 election, to the 23rd session, when it was raised to 11.

The Mexican Revolution and its aftermath saw a breakdown in the constitutional order in the state, when it was governed by a series of military governors. As late as 1926, election results were disputed, with competing gubernatorial candidates setting up rival congresses and bloodshed on the streets of Cuernavaca. Order was restored on 20 April 1930 with the election of the 24th Congress, which comprised seven deputies.

The legislative provisions of the Constitution of Morelos were amended in 1974. The number of SMD deputies was increased from seven to nine, and a proportional representation system was introduced whereby parties securing 5% or more of the popular vote would be entitled to representation (the mechanism known as "party deputies", or diputados de partido). Further amendments to state electoral law in 1979 increased the number of SMDs to 12. The 41st Congress was installed on 4 May 1979 with the 12 district members and three party deputies (one each from the PAN, PARM and PPS). Further modifications were made in 1993 that increased the number of SMDs to 15 and introduced a state-wide party list system to elect up to 10 PR deputies.

The 47th Congress, elected in 1997, comprised 18 SMD and 12 PR deputies. It was the first in which the PRI did not command an absolute majority, with 13 seats out of 30.

The current composition of the Congress of Morelos, with 12 SMDs and 8 PR seats, was introduced for the 2018 election, to the 54th congressional session.

=== 2018 election ===
Local elections were held in Morelos on 1 July 2018, concurrently with the general election. In addition to the members of the state congress, voters also elected a new governor and municipal authorities.

2018 Congress of Morelos election
Party	Seats			Change
Party	SMD	PR	Total	Change
Morena	8	0	8	
Social Encounter Party	3	0	3	
Labor Party	1	1	2	
National Action Party	0	1	1	
Institutional Revolutionary Party	0	1	1	
Party of the Democratic Revolution	0	1	1	
Citizens' Movement	0	1	1	
New Alliance Party	0	1	1	
Humanist Party	0	1	1	
Partido Socialdemócrata de Morelos	0	1	1	
Total	12	8	20	
Source: IMPEPAC

=== 2021 election ===
Local elections were held in Morelos on 6 June 2021. In addition to the members of the state congress, voters also elected new municipal authorities.

2021 Congress of Morelos election
Party	Seats			Change
Party	SMD	PR	Total	Change
Morena	6	1	7	▲1
National Action Party	3	2	5	▲4
Citizens' Movement	1	1	2	▲1
Institutional Revolutionary Party	1	1	2	▲1
Labor Party	0	1	1	▼1
New Alliance Party	1	0	1	Steady
Progressive Social Networks	0	1	1	▲1
Morelos Progresa	0	1	1	▲1
Social Encounter Party	0	0	0	▼5
Party of the Democratic Revolution	0	0	0	▼1
Humanist Party	0	0	0	▼1
Partido Socialdemócrata de Morelos	0	0	0	▼1
Total	12	8	20	
Source: IMPEPAC

=== 2024 election ===
Local elections were held in Morelos on 2 June 2024, concurrently with the general election. In addition to the members of the state congress, voters also elected a new governor and municipal authorities.

2024 Congress of Morelos election
Party	Seats			Change
Party	SMD	PR	Total	Change
National Regeneration Movement	8	2	10	▲3
National Action Party	3	1	4	▼1
Labor Party	1	1	2	▲1
Citizens' Movement	0	1	1	▼1
Ecologist Green Party of Mexico	0	1	1	▲1
Institutional Revolutionary Party	0	1	1	▼1
New Alliance Party	0	1	1	Steady
Total	12	8	20	
Source: Radio Fórmula
