= El Oro de Hidalgo =

El Oro
- Municipality
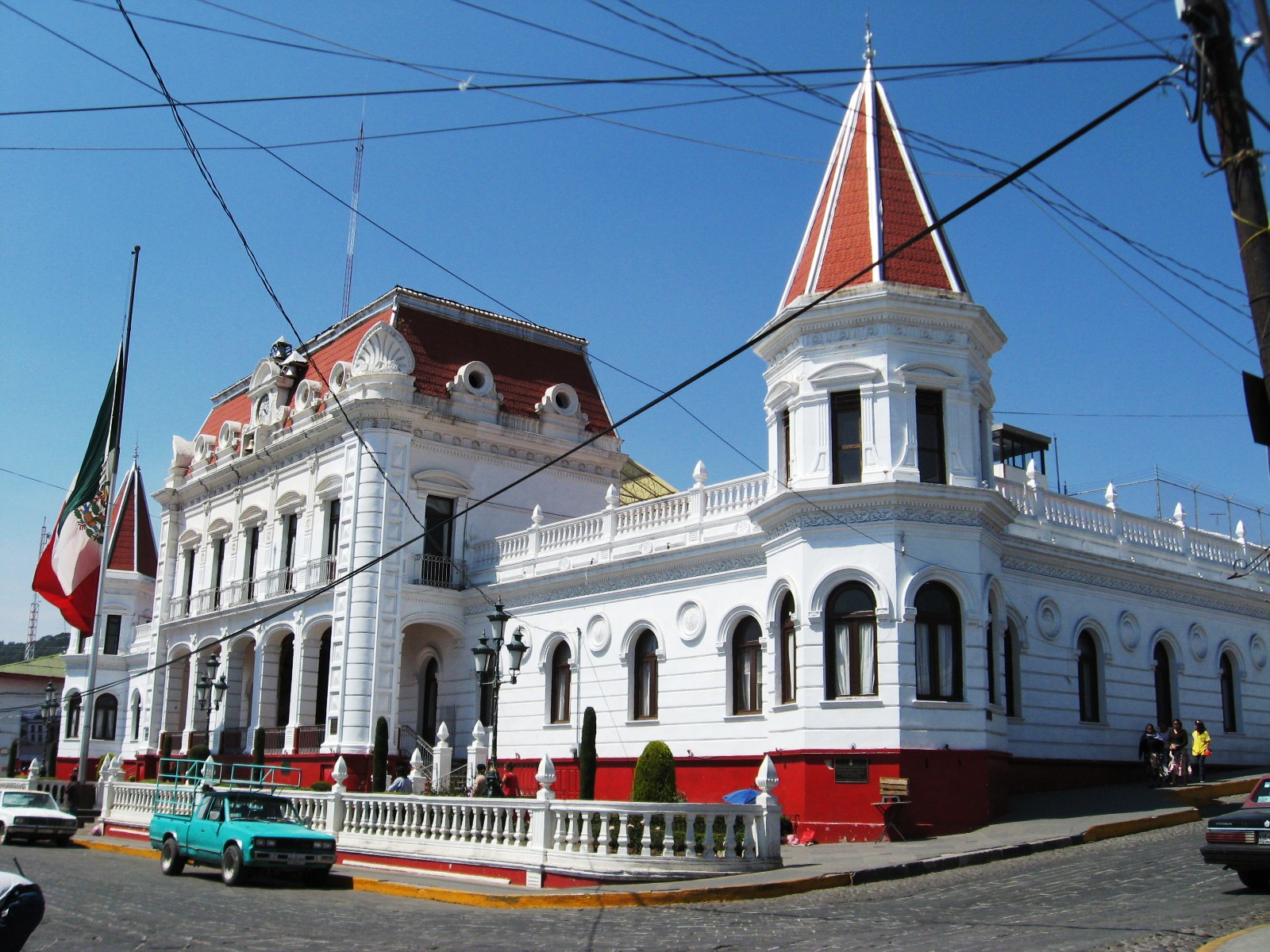

- Location within State of Mexico Location within Mexico
- Coordinates: 19°48′03″N 100°07′53″W
- Country: Mexico
- State: State of Mexico
- Municipality: El Oro
- Municipal seat: El Oro de Hidalgo
- Town Founded: 1787
- Municipality Founded: 1901

Government
  - Municipal President: Gilberto López Martínez (2006–2009)

Area
  - Municipality: 137.86 km^{2} (53.23 sq mi)
- Elevation (of seat): 2,740 m (8,990 ft)

Population (2005) Municipality
  - Municipality: 31,847
  - Seat: 5,797
- Time zone: UTC-6 (Central (US Central))
- Postal code (of seat): 50600
- Website: eloromexico.gob.mx

El Oro is one of 125 municipalities in the State of Mexico within the United Mexican States. The municipal seat is the town of El Oro de Hidalgo. The name El Oro (Spanish: [el ˈoɾo]) means "the gold" in Spanish. It has subsequently been given an alternative Nahuatl name of "Teocuitlatl", meaning "sacred excrement" (referring to gold). Its seal, in the form of an Aztec glyph, contains elements referring to gold and to caves, of which there are many in the municipality.

The municipality is located in the northwest of the State of Mexico, 96 km from the state capital of Toluca, and is bounded by the municipalities of Temascalcingo to the north, Jocotitlán to the east, San Felipe del Progreso and San José del Rincón to the south, and by the state of Michoacán to the west. As of 2005, the municipal seat with the formal name of El Oro de Hidalgo had a population of 5,797, and the municipality of El Oro had a population of 31,847. While the settlement made its name as a major gold- and silver-mining town from the 17th to the early 20th centuries, the mines have since been tapped out and the town is turning to tourism for economic development.

== The town ==
=== History ===
The Mazahua people first populated this area, migrating from the north. One of these migrations is documented in the Annals of Cuauhtitlán, which occurred in 538 AD, when five tribes headed by Ehécatl, Coahuatzin, Mazacóatl, Otzihuacoatl and Tlalpanhuitz y Huitz, with Mazacóatl leading them. The first populations settled in communities now known as Tapaxco, Endotejiare, Tultenango and Santiago Oxtempan, all of which are in the current municipality of El Oro. Initially, the Mazahuas were hunter-gatherers but dedicated themselves to agriculture and fishing as well as hunting, as the Mazahua-populated region became dominated the Toltecs, the Chichimecas and then the Aztecs. The last group conquered this area in 1474 by Axayacatl.

Up until the Spanish Conquest of Mexico, there was no settlement in what is now the town of El Oro, nor was its gold deposit discovered. In nearby Tlalpujahua, gold was being mined and this brought the Spaniards to the area. Some traces of gold were found early in the colonial period, especially in nearby Tapaxco, but the traces were not investigated further.

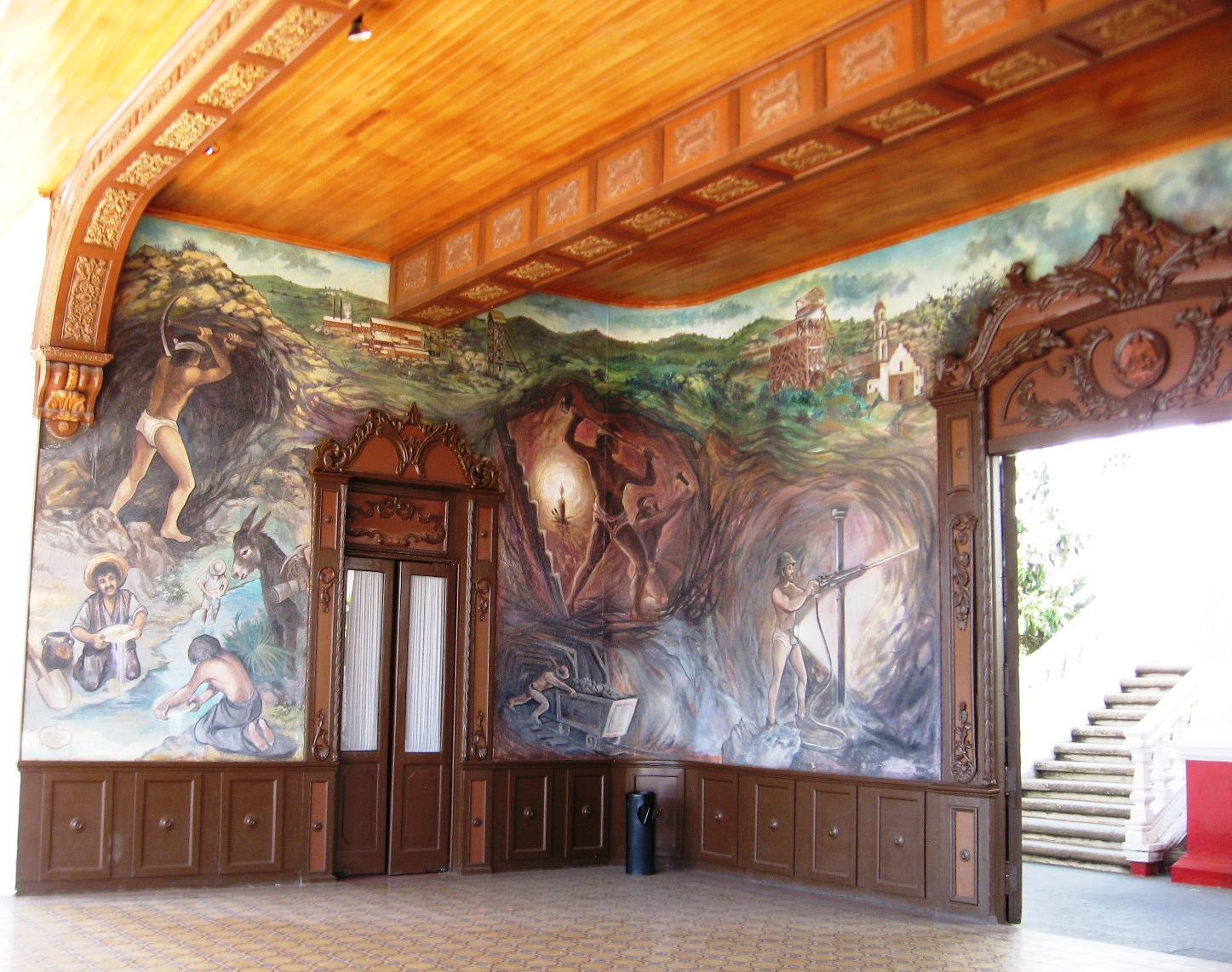
Mural "Genesis of the Miner by Manuel D´Rugama

It was gold that brought about the settlement and one of the town's early names was El Real de El Oro, which was a mining community under the jurisdiction of Ixtlahuaca. There are conflicting stories as to how the town was founded. One version states that it was founded by the Mondragón family, guided by a child who showed them where he grazed his flock. Here someone in the family noticed something shiny among the rocks, which turned out to be quartz containing gold, indicating the vein that would be named after the family.

El Oro was founded in 1787 by miners who bought the land from the Hacienda of Tultenango. El Oro initially belonged to the territory of Ixtlahuaca, but upon discovery of gold, the land became Crown property. In 1793, the mining community was given municipality status and authority over the neighboring communities of Tapaxco, San Nicolás, Santiago Oxtempan, Santa Rosa, Hacienda La Jordana, Hacienda Venta del Aire and Hacienta Tultenango. It also gained rights to regulate all mineral extraction in this area.

Twenty two years after the discovery of gold here, the Count of Revillagigedo hired engineer Manuel Agustín Mascaró to plan out the community, which was centered just northeast of where the downtown is now. The town had become an important source of gold and silver in late colonial times, but there were problems with supplying food and other needs due to the rocky terrain. El Oro's first chapel was built in 1791, but the seat of ecclesiastical power in the area as established in Tapaxco, four years earlier.

Miguel Hidalgo's army passed through the municipality on its way to Mexico City. After independence, engineer Vicente Rivafola and Lucas Alamán worked to create mining companies here with investment funds from British sources. One such company, called the Tlalpuajuhua Company revitalized 86 mines in the area. Another important company was the United Mexican Mining Association. Before Independence, El Oro mines had been productive but they were mostly shut down during the war. By 1825, most mining here was in English hands. This led to a significant population of foreigners here, mostly English and French, who influenced the town's culture. This would eventually lead to the building of the municipal palace and the Juárez Theater with Neoclassic and Art Nouveau designs. Foreign investment here reached its peak near the end of the 19th century into the early 20th century, introducing new technologies, such as a rail line, and electricity. These were introduced primarily in the town of El Oro, which began to establish it as the primary center over Tapaxco. Furthering its importance was the discovery of the Esperanza vein, which greatly increased the town's population. El Oro was declared the head of the municipality by two decrees, one issued in 1901 and the other in 1902, giving it the town official name of El Oro de Hidalgo. In 1905 the world's longest power transmission line was built between a hydroelectric power station in Necaxa and El Oro with an overall length of 270 km. Parts of the power line are still in service, despite the age.

In 1926, a number of mines, including El Oro Mining and Railway Co., La Esperanza Mining and others, began to cut back production, stating that the deposits were tapped out. The situation worsened when the mining companies where expropriated from their English owners in 1937. Soon the only operating mine was one called Dos Estrellas, located between El Oro and Tlalpujahua, which subsequently closed in 1958. In the mid-20th century, El Oro was left with only 2,500 residents. Since that time, the town's economy has turned to commerce, light industry, and handcrafts.

=== Points of interest ===
The Municipal Palace is the seat of government for both the town and the surrounding municipality. The first palace was built in 1829 of wood and nicknamed "The White House." The current one was inaugurated in 1910. This municipal palace is distinctive for it combination of Neoclassic and Art Nouveau designs. This is a result of the English and French populations as well as the preference during the Porfirio Díaz presidency between the 19th and 20th centuries for French style. The two towers of the palace are of English design. The façade, with its balustrade, lamps and fencing show Neoclassic influence. Its portico, courtyard and "Salon de Cabildos" or Delegation Hall is Art Nouveau in design. Just about the whole building is in its original condition. On either side of the main entrance, there is a mural by Manuel D´Rugama called "The Genesis of the Miner."

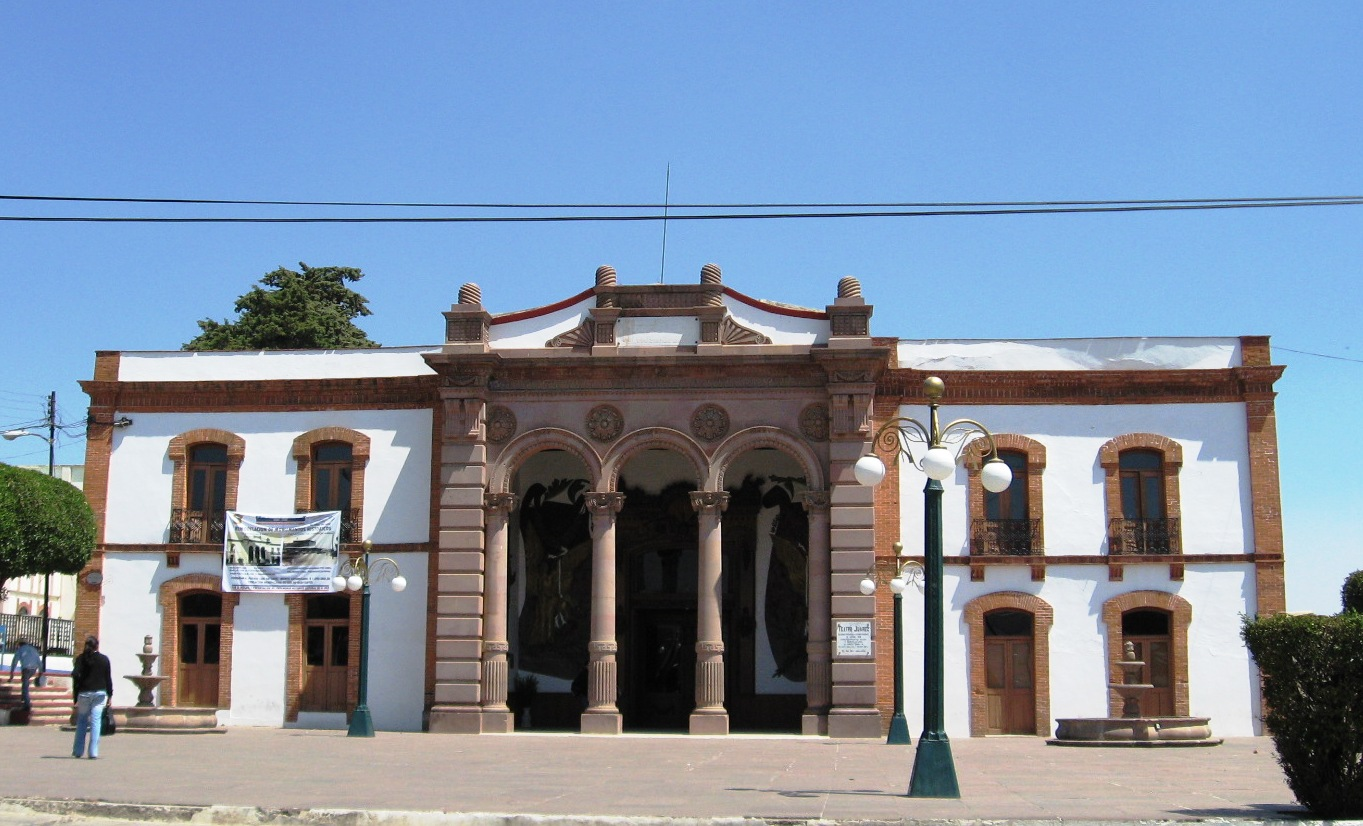
The Juárez Theater

The Juárez Theater and is of French Neoclassic style. During the height of the town's mining, this theater attracted top-level talent of the early 20th century such as Ángela Peralta, Enrico Caruso, María Conesa and others. The interior is of Moorish design with gilded decorative plant motifs indicative of Art Nouveau. The side booths are done in sculpted wood and stylized lions can be found in the pilasters.

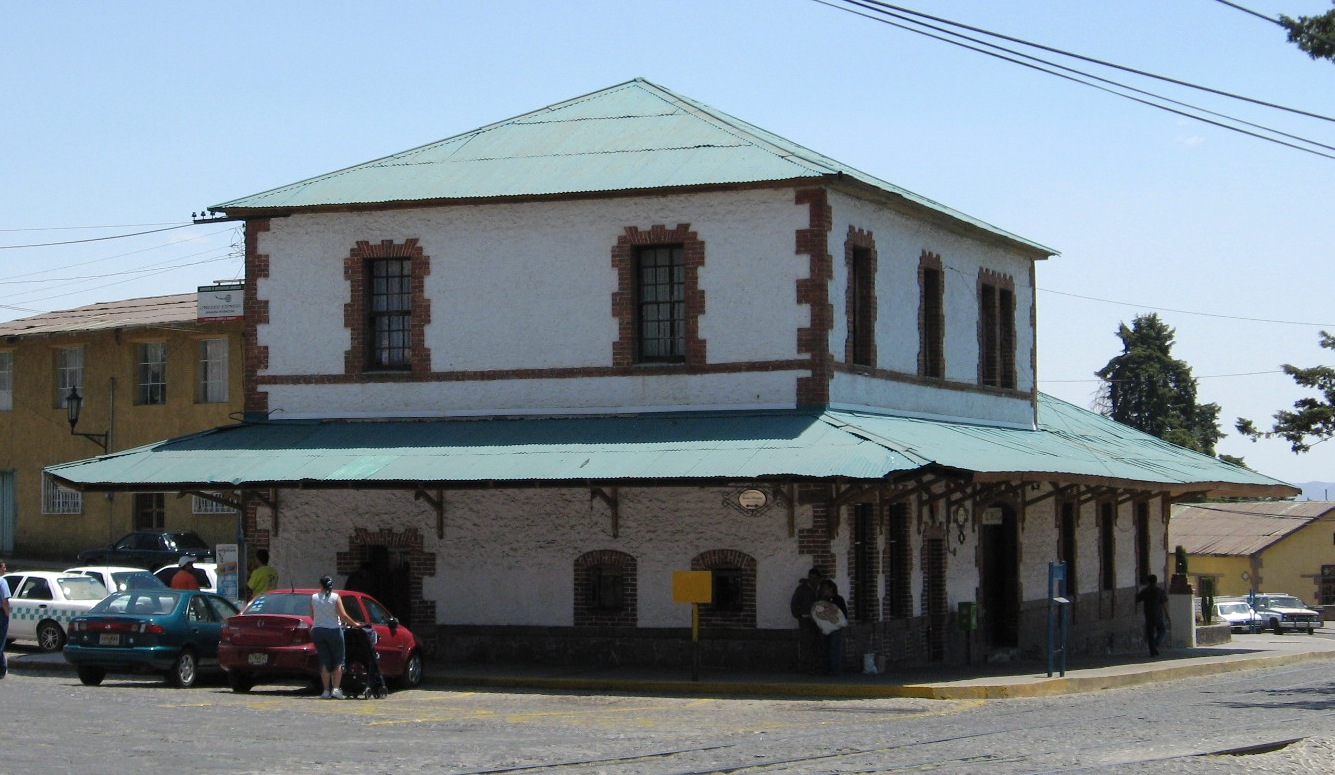
Old train station

The train station was completed at the very end of the 19th century and inaugurated by President Porfirio Díaz. Its architecture is typical of the time but also shows English influence. Running from here to Tultenango and Villa Victoria, rail line leading here was created for the mines, but the trains carried both cargo and passengers. The first owner of the line was Manning Gold Company. The rail line was completed in 1860, but the station was completed in 1899. To the side of the station is an antique rail car which contains a restaurant, which contains a collection of photographs from the town's mining heyday.

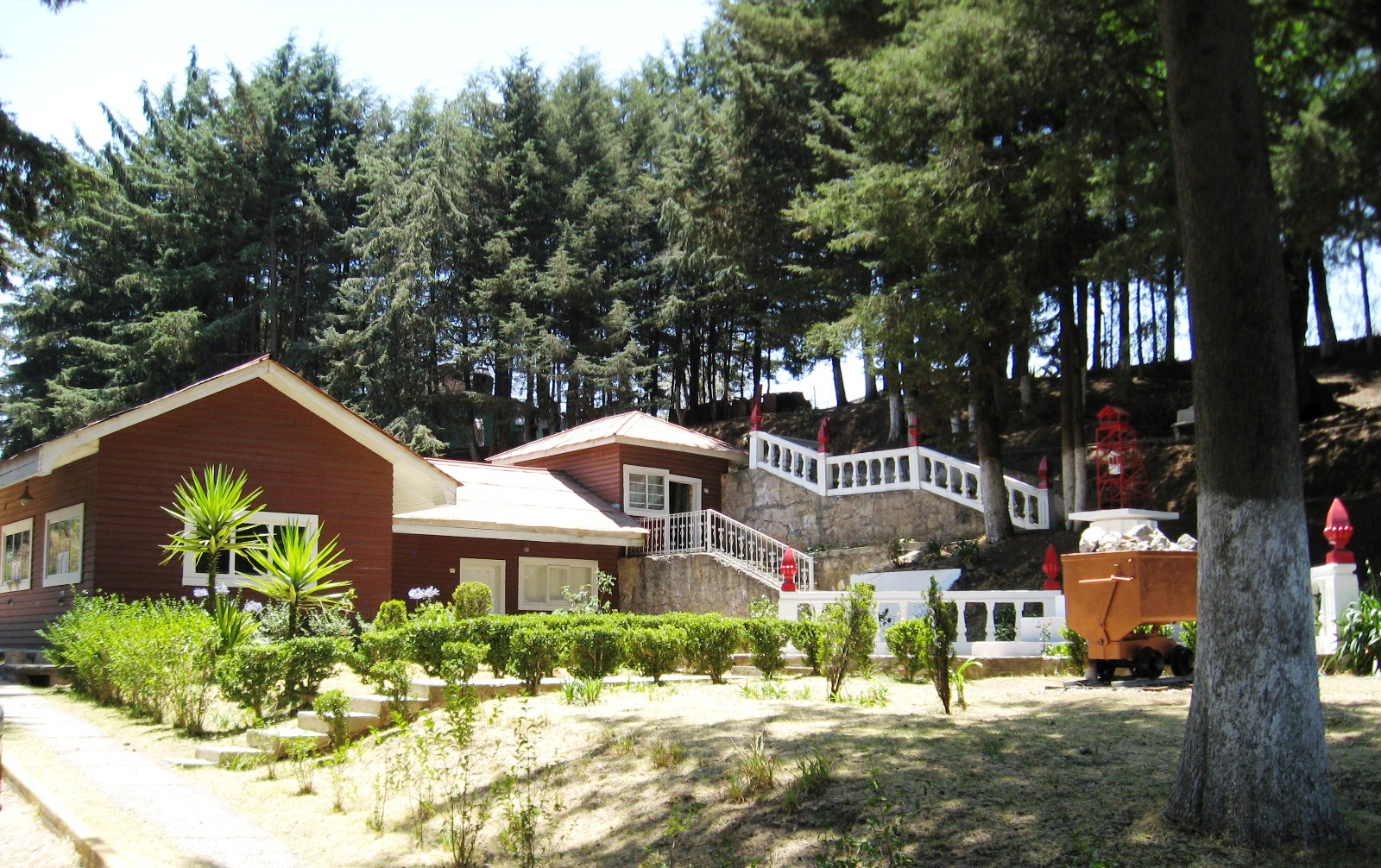
Mining Museum

The Mining Museum depicts El Oro's history as one of the country's most productive mining area, starting from the 17th century to the first half of the 20th. The museum is located at a former mine shaft, with a collection of photographs from the La Esperanza, La Provedenica, La Descubridora and Dos Estrellas mines, during their peak operation. Also on display are mining machinery and mineral samples from the various mines.

=== Cuisine ===
Typical dishes of this area include red or green mole with turkey or chicken, barbacoa, and carnitas. A local sweet is called "cola de macho," which is made from dried fruit and piloncillo sugar. Beverages include pulque and two very local drinks called "sende choo," a fermented corn drink, and"agua de sambumbia," which is made from fermented pineapple husks.

A drink peculiar to El Oro is called "chiva". It is a digestif, or alcoholic drink taken after meals. It was most in demand with miners from the mid-19th century to the mid-20th century. This drink was thought to calm nerves and promote the health of the miners. It was invented by Jacobita Galán Archundia, owner of a bar, who infused medicinal herbs into alcohol. The recipe varies with every family and establishment that makes it, and each is jealously guarded. It is typically prepared with the herbs prodigiosa and anise. However, despite its supposed curative properties, it is now mostly drunk by tourists to the town.

=== Festivals ===
There are two major festivals in the town. The first is Carnival, celebrated with the typical costumes and parades, but cockfights, charreada rodeos and horse racing. The other is the feast day of the Virgin of Guadalupe, as the town's main church is named after her. In addition to processions and fireworks, regional indigenous dances are performed.

== The municipality ==
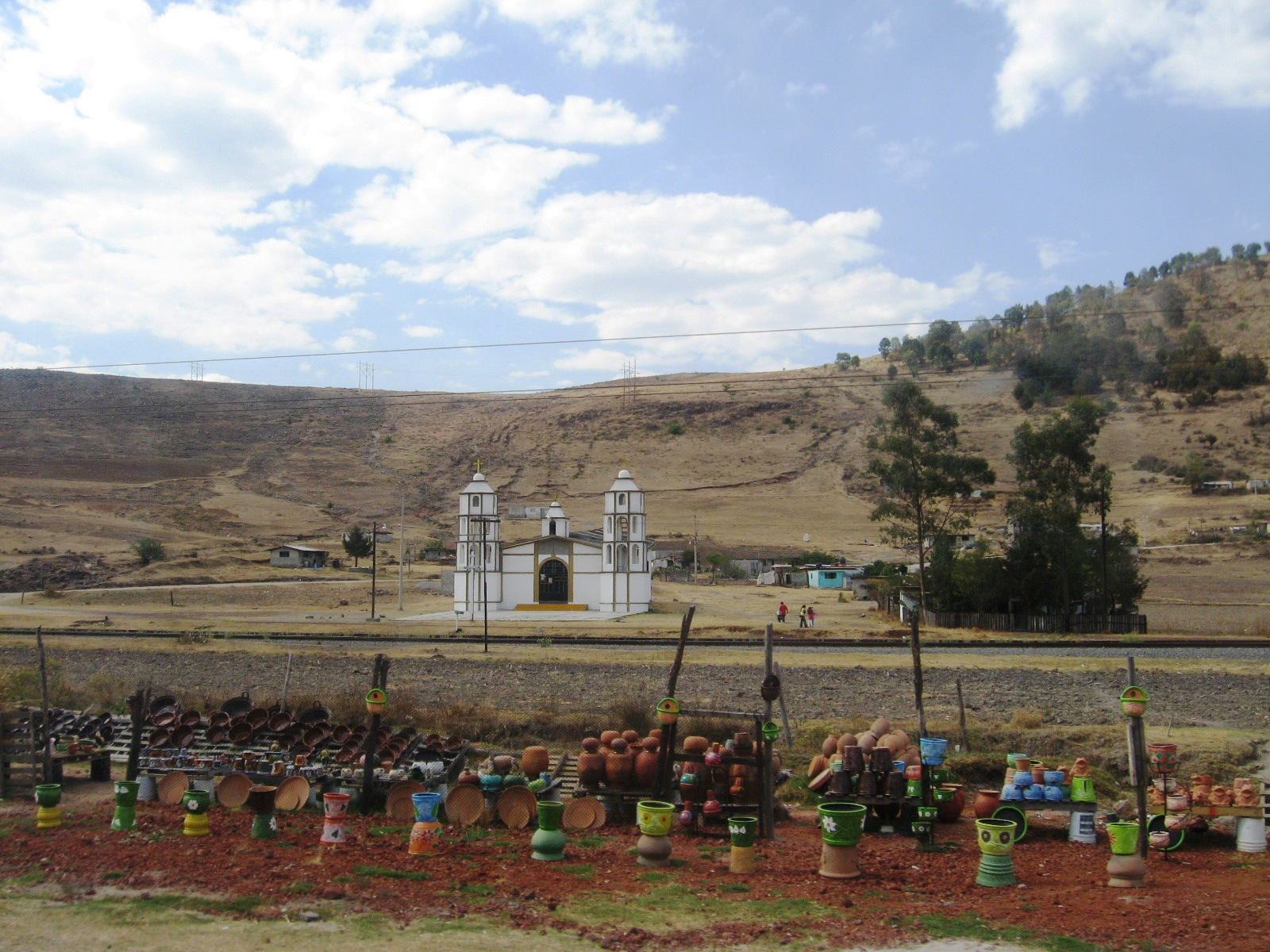
Church of the community of Bassoco de Hidalgo

As municipal seat, the town of El Oro de Hidalgo is the governing authority for the following communities: Adolfo López Mateos, Ejido San Nicolás el Oro (Agua Escondida), Bassoco de Hidalgo, Buenavista (Buenavista Tapaxco), Citeje, Concepción Primera, La Concepción (La Concepción Segunda), Colonia Cuauhtémoc, Endotejiare, La Jordana, La Magdalena Morelos, La Mesa, La Nopalera, La Palma, Presa Brockman, Pueblo Nuevo de los Ángeles, San Nicolás Tultenango, Santa Rosa de Lima, Ejido Santiago Oxtempan, Santiago Oxtempan, Tapaxco, Santa Cruz el Tejocote (El Tejocote), Estación Tultenango (Tultenango), Venta del Aire, Yomeje, Cerro Llorón, Barrio del Gigante, El Mogote, San Isidro Ejido de Tapaxco, El Libramiento (Cerro de Estrellita), Barrio de las Peñitas, San Nicolás el Oro (San Nicolás), Santa Rosa de Guadalupe, Ex-hacienda de Santo Domingo Tultenango, La Soledad, Jales Tiro México, El Carmen, Laguna Seca, Loma del Capulín, Lázaro Cárdenas, Llanito Cuatro, Colonia Monte Alto and La Loma de la Cima. The municipality has a total area of 137.86 km^{2} (53.23 sq mi).

There is no post-independence document of the founding the modern municipality of El Oro. Its organization is in accordance of the Cadiz Constitution, like the rest of the municipalities in the country have been since 1820. City councils existed at both Tapaxco and El Oro in the 1820s and the municipality has held both names. The determination to make El Oro the seat and the name of the municipality was made in the very early 1900s. It is located in the Sierra Madre Occidental, in the Tlalpujahua range, which extends into Temascalcingo and Atlacomulco. "La Somera" is the highest peak at 3,200 meters located next to the town of El Oro. The municipality has 36 springs, seven natural deep wells, 54 arroyos, 18 dams and five aqueducts. The main river here is called "El Oro" or "San Juan" which flows through a canyon between the La Somera and San Nicolas mountains. Its flow varies greatly between the rainy and dry seasons.

About 37% of the land in the municipality is dedicated to farming, but generally these are small plots with crops for local use. Some livestock is also raised here, primarily for dairy and pork products. There is some small light industry here as well as commerce, which is concentrated in the municipal seat. Since the end of mining in the area, areas outside the town have turned to logging, stonework and crafts. More recently, a tourism trade is being developed to take advantage of the natural surroundings of the area as well as the interesting architectural features that can be found in the towns of the municipality.

Near the capital of the municipality is the San José del Rincon Monarch Butterfly Sanctuary. These butterflies appear here from November to March. The Sanctuary has rustic lodgings as well as restaurants, horse rentals, trained guides and handcraft vendors. The sanctuary also has educational programs designed to promote the conservation of the monarch butterfly.

The Brockman Dam is located about 4 km south of the town of El Oro on the road to Villa Victoria. It was built by Guillermo Brockman to act as a reservoir for water for the mines and homes of El Oro and Tlalpujahua. Today, it is promoted as an ecotourism spot for camping, picnicking and rainbow trout fishing. It fairly isolated, surrounded by pines, cedars and a few country residences. There are rustic cabins for rent here.

There is also an unexplored archeological site between Endotejiare and Tapaxco.
