= Unintended Lessons of Revolution =

2021 non-fiction book by Tanalís Padilla

Unintended Lessons of Revolution: Student Teachers and Political Radicalism in Twentieth-Century Mexico (2021) is a non-fiction book by Latin Americanist historian Tanalís Padilla. It was published by Duke University Press.

It was inspired while researching for Rural Resistance in the Land of Zapata (2008), having noticed "the role of rural teachers", and by the Iguala mass kidnapping, whose 43 missing victims the book is dedicated to. It covers Mexican normal schools' development of "a very radical tradition" from their foundation in the 1920s under Education Minister José Vasconcelos, substantial institutional backing under President Lázaro Cárdenas and Education Sub-Secretary Moisés Sáenz, effect of 1940s urbanization, and anti-communist and Catholic backlash in the 1950s. From chapter four the book covers the tumultuous 1960s and increasing involvement with radical and guerrilla movements, especially under President Gustavo Díaz Ordaz; their position under President Luis Echeverría, and in the epilogue their legacy and influence into the 2000s.

== Reception ==
Historian Kevan Antonio Aguilar praised it for representing the different gender and indigenous perspectives from interviews. According to Aguilar, men remembered the "catharsis of protests and participation in agrarian struggles" whilst women spoke more of the imposed labor stemming from gender norms. Such was complimented by anthropologist Wil G. Pansters. Aguilar furthermore found it a "wonderful contribution to a rich historiography", but wished it interacted with other Latin American literature on student movements; specifically Victoria Langland (Brazil), Vania Markarian (Uruguay), Marian Schlotterbeck (Chile), and Heather Vrana (Guatemala). Historian A. S. Dillingham additionally complimented its coverage of mestizaje.

- Other reviews:

== Sources ==
=== Bibliography ===
- Aguilar, Kevan Antonio (2023). "Unintended Lessons of Revolution: Student Teachers and Political Radicalism in Twentieth-Century Mexico by Tanalís Padilla (review)". Journal of Social History. 56 (3). Oxford University Press: 703–705. doi:10.1093/jsh/shac034. ISSN 1527-1897. OCLC 1008627359. Project MUSE 886537 EBSCOhost 162294661
- Dillingham, A. S. (July 2023). "Mexican Teachers and the State". The Americas. 80 (3). Cambridge: Cambridge University Press: 533–534. doi:10.1017/tam.2023.53. ISSN 0003-1615. OCLC 9957174317. Project MUSE 904355 EBSCOhost 169810570
