= José Manuel Agüero Tovar =

Mexican politician (born 1971)

- Born: 5 October 1971 (age 54); Jiutepec, Morelos, Mexico
- Occupation: Politician
- Political party: PRI

José Manuel Agüero Tovar (born 5 October 1971) is a Mexican politician from the Institutional Revolutionary Party (PRI). From 2009 to 2012 he served as a federal deputy in the 61st Congress, representing the second district of Morelos.
