= Tlaltizapán =

Coordinates: 18°40′58″N 99°07′13″W

- Municipality
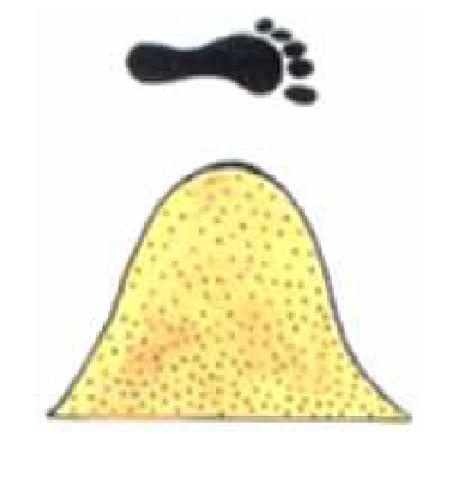
- Coat of arms

- Location in Mexico Tlaltizapán (Mexico)
- Country: Mexico
- State: Morelos
- Demonym: (in Spanish)
- Time zone: UTC−6 (CST)

Tlaltizapán de Zapata is a city in the Mexican state of Morelos.

The city serves as the municipal seat for the surrounding municipality, with which it shares a name. The toponym Tlaltizapán comes from a Nahuatl name and means tlal-tli (land), tiza-tl (white powder), pan ("on" or "over"); "on white land" or "feet on white land". The city is situated on a white hill. De Zapata pays homage to the hero of the Liberation Army of the South during the Mexican Revolution.

The Municipality of Tlaltizapán de Zapata borders the Municipalities of Emiliano Zapata, Morelos; Yautepec de Zaragoza; and Ciudad Ayala to the north; the Municipalities of Ayala and Tlaquiltenango to the south; Ayala to the east; and Tlaquiltenango, Jojutla, Zacatepec de Hidalgo, Puente de Ixtla, Xochitepec. and Emiliano Zapata to the west. The municipal seat is located at an altitude of 950 meters above sea level.

The municipality reported 52,110 inhabitants in the year 2015 census.

In 2023, Tlaltizapán de Zapata was designated a Pueblo Mágico by the Mexican government, recognizing its cultural and historical importance.

== History ==
=== Prehispanic history ===
Early settlers in Tlaltizapán were Xochimilcas; they founded the towns of Tetela, Hueyapan, Ocuituco, Tepoztlán, and Totolapan where they mixed with even older settlers of Jumiltepec and Nepopolco. During the Prehispanic era, these people were subjects of and paid tribute to the Aztecs of the Valley of Mexico.

=== Conquest and colonial era ===
During the colonial era, Tlaltizapán, like most of the state of Morelos, became part of the Marquesado del Valle de Oaxaca, of the conquistador Hernán Cortés. During the Marquesado period, Tlaltizapán was a horse farm established in 1549, managed by Pablo de Paz.

The Dominicans built the monastery of Tlaltizapán around 1550 CE. Gerhaed dates the monastery to 1591, disagreeing with both the 1576 date on the façade and a possible date of 1540. Perhaps the differences can be explained by considering the existence of two monasteries; the first related to the chapel of the Indians and the second to the cloister courtyard of the current monastery.

There are ruins of chapels of abandoned Indians, indicative of the congregation in the 17th century. There are indications that Indigenous health traditions were persecuted by the Church; we can point to the banks of the Yautepec River as an area of healers. Towards the east, there were important Indigenous settlements like San Pablo de Nexpa

=== Independence and 19th century ===
The hero the Mexican War of Independence, Francisco Ayala, was captured at the Temilpa ranch, located in this municipality. Ayala had become seriously ill with malaria, and he was captured and taken to Yautepec, where he was shot in 1812. The ranch has been in ruins since then.

When the state of Morelos was created in 1869, Tlaltizapán was elevated to the category of municipality.

=== Revolution and 20th century ===
On Monday, June 2, 1916, during the Mexican Revolution, General Emiliano Zapata established his headquarters in Tlaltizapán in order to fight Carrancista troops. The barracks have long been torn down, but visitors can still see the former mill, turned into army headquarters. The fighting hit Tlaltizapán hard; 60% of the population were killed or fled—the population dropped from 8,000 residents in 1910 to 3,200 in 1921. Carrancista soldiers slaughtered 280 men, women, and children on June 2, 1916, and another 250 on August 13 of the same year. Similar massacres may have occurred in June and September 1916. When the Spanish flu epidemic broke out in 1918, Carrancista soldiers circled the town and would not allow the Mexican Red Cross enter.

On May 9, 1983, the State Congress changed the name of the municipality to Tlaltizapán de Pacheco in honor of former Governor Carlos Pacheco (1876-1880).

=== 21st century ===
Alfredo Dominguez Mandujano of Juntos por Morelos (Together for Morelos coalition: PRD-PSD) was elected Presidente Municipal (mayor) on July 1, 2018.

The state of Morelos reported 209 cases and 28 deaths due to the COVID-19 pandemic in Mexico as of April 27, 2020; four cases were reported in Amacuzac. Schools and many businesses were closed from mid March until June 1. On July 2, Tlatltizapán reported 18 infections and three deaths from the virus; the reopening of the state was pushed back until at least June 13. Tlaltizapán reported 122 cases, 88 recuperations, and 31 deaths from the virus as of August 31. Two hundred eighteen cases were reported on December 27, 2020.

== Tourism and attractions ==
- Carnaval De Bahidorá 2019, Las Estacas. 15-17 Feb 2019.
- Los Sauces. Ecotourism in a waterpark with a river that is one kilometer of fresh water, ideal for families. Pets and fishing allowed. Parking, green areas, wading pool, restaurant, grills, campground. Rental of kayaks.
- Santa Isabel waterpark. Spring water (22°-24 °C), swimming pool, wading pool, waterslide, cabins, hotel, campground, "Gotcha", lake for small boats.

There are several haciendas in Tlaltizapán. San Miguel Treinta was built in 1732 por José Francisco de Verástegui. De Verastegui also owned Santa Rosa Treinta; only 23 hectares are left of these once-powerful haciendas. The church of San Miguel still functions and is open to the public, and there are large festivals held in the saint's honor. San José de Acamilpa was founded 1604 by the Colegio de Cristo and was once a major producer of sugarcane. In 1855 produced 2,400 barrels of schnapps. Today it is a resort hotel. Other haciendas are Ticumán, San Francisco, and Xochimancas.

=== San Miguel Arcangel monastery ===
The monastery of San Miguel Arcangel in Tlaltizapan was built by members of the Dominican Order about 1535. The church is rectangular with a side chapel located at the cross of the church. The ceiling is simple; supported by arches and tall columns. The side chapel is notable for its octagonal cupola. The main entrance to the west is very simple. The door is tall and narrow with a half-arc; there are discrete pilasters on the sides and a simple cornice above. Above that, there is a small, pink stone window. The front does not have any decoration except for the massive buttress on the southwest and the foundations of the tower on the northwest corner. The tower is simple and austere; above it, there is a square belfry with four open windows. The second level is smaller and eight-sided, while the third level is little more than a light tower, and the fourth level is smaller still. The access door to the monastery has two beautiful arches, making it a luxurious entrance to an austere building. Located on the north side of the church, the monastery has two floors with a central patio. The rectangular atrium is surrounded by several monuments to the Mexican Revolution.

Other historical churches are San José, la Virgen de Guadalupe, San Pedro, Santo Domingo de Guzmán and Santa Rosa de Lima.

=== Las Estacas ===
Las Estacas Natural Reserve and Spa belongs to the state ecological reserve Sierra de Montenegro-Las Estacas. It has crystal-clear water that flows from a spring that produces 7,000 liters (247 cubic feet) / second, forming a natural diving pool that is 10,000 years old. The name is due to the fact that in the past they used to drive stakes on the river bank to control irrigation. 500 meters of the river, which forms a tributary of the Yautepec River, is inside the park.

Visitors can swim or snorkel. Camping, cabins, and a hotel are available.

It is widely believed that a Tarzan movie was filmed at Las Estacas, but the closest seems to be the 1948 production of Tarzan and the Mermaids starring Johnny Weissmuller in 1948, which was filmed in Acapulco and other locations in Mexico.

== Communities ==
In accordance with the statistical data of the INEGI, the municipality has 66 localities (human settlements, which are considered up to one house), of which 39 are composed of settlements of 1 to 49 inhabitants; 11 localities have 50 to 99 inhabitants; three settlements of 100 to 499 inhabitants; five localities of 500 to 999 inhabitants; four locations from 1,000 to 1,999 inhabitants; two locations of 3,000 to 4,000 inhabitants; one of 9,893 inhabitants (the municipal seat). and the largest town in the municipality is Santa Rosa Treinta with 16,474 inhabitants.

The Municipality of Tlaltizapán has one city (the municipal seat of Tlaltizapán), four urban localities (Santa Rosa Treinta, Ticumán, Huatecalco, and Tlaltizapán), with more than 2,500 inhabitants each; four semi-urban locations (Acamilpa, Bonifacio García, Temimilcingo, and Pueblo Nuevo), which have a population range of 1,000 to 2,500 inhabitants, and 58 rural localities with fewer than 1,000 inhabitants.

== Festivals and dances ==
- February 14, carnaval de Bahidorá in Las Estecas
- Five days before Ash Wednesday, Carnaval in Tlaltizapán. It includes Chinelos dancers, jaripeos (bulls), and brass bands. There are also activities during Holy Week and on the Good Friday.
- March 19, feast of San José, patrón saint of Acamilpa. Carnaval.
- April 10, the death of General Emiliano Zapata is commemorated.
- August 4, feast of Sto. Domingo de Guzmán, patron saint of Ticumán.
- August 13, Martyrs of Tlaltizapán.
- August 15, feast of la Virgen de la Asunción. Fair in Temimilcingo.
- August 29–30, feast of Santa Rosa de Lima. Dances and jaripeos (bulls).
- September 29, feast of San Miguel Arcángel, patron saint of Tlaltizapán.
- September 29, feast of San Miguel Arcángel, patron saint of San Miguel Treinta.
- November 13, feast of San Diego in Ticumán.
- December 12, feast of Our Lady of Guadalupe.
- December 23, 5 km "Carrera del Pavo" (English: Turkey Trot) to promote sports.

There are eight brass bands in Tlaltizapán.

== Handicrafts ==
Ceramics and felt and porcelain dolls are made in Huatecalco. Acampilpa is known for its pottery and for leather goods in the El Mirador colony. In Palo Prieto families make baskets, ladles, and birdcages.

== Food ==
Green mole of pipían; tamales of cenizas; red mole of turkey; cecina with cheese, cream and green sauce; barbacoa de cabrito (goat), pozole with pork or chicken, tamales of catfish (made in leaves of totomozcle), and clemole seasoned with wild plums or tamarind make up the local cuisine.

== See also ==
- List of people from Morelos
- Francisco Plancarte y Navarrete
