= Rodolfo Esquivel Landa =

Mexican politician

- Born: 9 June 1959 (age 66); Emiliano Zapata, Morelos, Mexico
- Occupation: Politician
- Political party: PAN

Rodolfo Esquivel Landa (born 9 June 1959) is a Mexican politician affiliated with the National Action Party (PAN). In 2003–2006 he served as a federal deputy in the 59th Congress, representing the second district of Morelos.
