= Comando Jaramillista Morelense 23 de Mayo =

Rebel group in Mexico

Comando Jaramillista Morelense 23 de May CJ23M
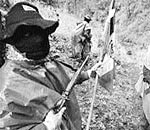
- CJM23 guerrillas in a camp in the Sierra de Morelos
- Leader: Unknown
- Dates active: 2004–2009
- Active regions: Morelos, Mexico
- Ideology: Agrarianism; Democratic socialism Left-wing nationalism Marxism–Leninism
- Status: Inactive

The Comando Jaramillista Morelense of May 23 (shortened CJ23M) is a rebel group in Mexico, attached to agrarian and leftist thoughts, taking the name of the agrarian leader and militar Rubén Jaramillo. His operation is a classic armed propaganda action that fulfilled one objective: to disseminate the existence of the command and its ideology. An initiative carried out at a time of profound political decomposition in the rest of the country, preceded by the making of paintings that gave account of the existence of the group in different parts of the states of Morelos.

== History ==
CJM took the name of Rubén Jaramillo, who was associated with a Zapatist movement in the 1940s and 1950s and was murdered on May 23, 1962. The bombings were a tribute to Jaramillio and carried out because CJM claimed to be against the corruption of government leaders; in particular, Sergio Estrada Cajigal (governor of Morelos) and President Vicente Fox. The group claims Estrada Cagijal is involved in drug trafficking and runs a corrupt and repressive government. The CJM claims not to be terrorists, but anti-government, and have stated they have no interest in harming civilians – one of the reasons why the bombing was on a Sunday (when the banks were closed and few people were about). The group was founded on May 24, 2004, where their first communiqué came out, claiming their first attack, taking the demands of Rubén Jaramillo as an ideological basis and "strengthening their legacy".

Between May 23, 2004, and May 23, 2009, the group issued nineteen Comunicados expressing their support of socialism and their opposition to neoliberalism without expressing specific demands. A similarly named group, Comando Jaramillista de la Region Oriente, issued a Comunicado in Oaxaca on November 11, 2004. Over the years there have been other armed groups in the State of Morelos. Besides the rebellions led by Ruben Jaramillo, the Partido Proletario Unido de América flourished in 1974. More recently, the Popular Revolutionary Army and Fuerzas Armadas Revolucionarias del Pueblo (People's Armed Revolutionary Forces) have been active.

The group is against the establishment of Neoliberalism in the country, especially during the final stretch of the presidency of Vicente Fox, in addition to being active during the 2006 elections, blaming the Partido Acción Nacional and the Partido Revolucionario Institucional and Partido Verde Ecologista de Mexico for the economic stagnation of the country. The attack took place a few days after the start of the III Summit of the European Union, Latin America and the Caribbean, which will be held in Guadalajara. The group also threatens to reactivate its military activity in the event that the elections are "a fix" calling the process as a "sacrifice of hundreds of revolutionaries and social fighters who lost their lives and freedom for the sake of a free, dignified and fair to all ". It also calls for the union of the various political and social organizations either from underground and from all perspectives (whether liberal, democratic, progressive, revolutionary, socialist, etc.)

The group also came to tie with the candidacy of Andrés Manuel López Obrador and notable peaceful civil movements during the 2006 elections, in addition to showing solidarity with the Bolivarian Revolution. The group calls for "resistance to be found in the defense and democratic transformation" of republican institutions and, consequently, in the reconstitution of the State and the Nation, as well as the members of The Other Campaign.

The May 15, 2004, the Federal Government and the Sindicato Nacional de Trabajadores de la Educación signed the Alliance for the Quality of Education, an agreement that seeks to transform the model education through public policies that promote higher quality and equity in education in the country. But this measure was received with hostility by some sectors of the teaching profession, provoking demonstrations, for supposedly affecting their labor rights. The group sympathized with these protests, describing the repression. The group also opposed the Lerma-Tres Marías highway projects, northwestern bypass and the Proyecyo siglo 21 with the highway of the sun. On May 23, 2009 the group released its statement number 19 in which they show their sympathy for various political and social movements that had suffered "persecution" by the government of Felipe Calderón Hinojosa. CJ23M only recently became a vocal group; prior activity is unheard of in the region.

== Attacks ==
=== Banamex attack ===
The May 24 CJM-23 claimed responsibility for the detonation of three devices in the bank branches and a fourth device that was found without exploding in a branch of Banamex, Bancomer, Santander Serfin and HSBC, in the city of Jiutepec, Cuernavaca, Morelos. The group also claimed to have placed an offering on the bust of Rubén Jaramillo, located in the city of Jiutepec. The attack was carried out in commemoration of the death of Rubén Jaramillo, in addition to strongly criticizing the government of Vicente Fox and the governor of the state of Morelos, Sergio Estrada Cajigal accusing his administration of corrupt and inefficient. The attacks said they were carried out against the corruption of government leaders Sergio Alberto Estrada Cajigal Ramírez, governor of Morelos and Vicente Fox.

=== Other incidents ===
In the following communiqués, they spoke about the death of indigenous activists such as Gregorio Sánchez Mercado, in the state of Guerrero and Pavel Gonzalez in Mexico City, in addition to accusing the neoliberal system of "impoverishing indigenous organizations." The group also criticizes the presidency of Vicente Fox and in addition to the economic and social policies that were developed during the government of the PAN and the PRI.

The October 23, 2005, an improvised explosive device detonated in front of a branch of BBVA in the municipality of Temixco, Morelos, causing material damage to other establishments within a 30-meter radius and leaving an attacker with minor injuries. Another explosive was also deactivated and two people were arrested, but released the next day.

The group claimed responsibility for the attack, however, the authorities investigated the incident, and came to the conclusion this was a lie.

== See also ==
- Zapatista Army of National Liberation
- Popular Revolutionary Army
- Liga Comunista 23 de Septiembre

== External sources ==
- CEDEMA list of communicados from Comando Jaramillista Morelense
