= Demetrio Román Isidoro =

Mexican architect and politician

- Born: 21 June 1959 (age 66); Morelos, Mexico
- Occupation: Politician
- Political party: PAN

Demetrio Román Isidoro (born 21 June 1959) is a Mexican architect and politician affiliated with the National Action Party. He served as a Deputy of the LX Legislature of the Mexican Congress representing Morelos. He previously served in the Congress of Morelos from 2000 to 2003 and the municipal president of Jiutepec from 2003 to 2006.
