= Rural Resistance in the Land of Zapata =

2008 non-fiction book by Tanalís Padilla

Rural Resistance in the Land of Zapata: The Jaramillista Movement and the Myth of the Pax Priísta, 1940–1962 (2008) is a non-fiction book by Latin Americanist historian Tanalís Padilla. It was published by Duke University Press.

The book covers leftist militant Rubén Jaramillo, follower of Emiliano Zapata, under the Institutional Revolutionary Party's (PRI) one-party state. Dissatisfied by the PRI's poor adherence the ideals of the Mexican Revolution, principally land reform, Jaramillo raised a movement.

== Reception ==
It was widely praised for its bibliography, including original interviews and official documents. Its analysis is recognized as influenced by the theories of Antonio Gramsci.

Historian Benjamin Smith underscored its importance for countering the narrative of peace under the PRI, centering women's participation in resistance, and contextualizing rural revolts in their national and international leftist space. However, he questioned the accuracy of Padilla's depiction of how frequently the state resorted to violence, but recognized cross-verifiability would be difficult since Mexican historiography has prioritized the post-revolutionary period (c. 1920–1940). He concluded it was a revisionist or neo-Gramscian work.

Historian Helga Baitenmann also commended Padilla's inclusion of women in the movement and illuminating resistance to the PRI in a period where its influence is typically described as "hegemonic". However, she deemed Padilla's depiction of the ejido and general society-state relations regarding agriculture as "simplistic", citing page 41 when summarizing her position as beneficiaries being "clients of the state and, by extension, of the newly emerging official party." Baitenmann contrasted it to the "nuanced" position of Jonathan Fox and Gustavo Gordillo, wherein ejidos served as a mechanism of state control but occasionally one for independence. Overall, she regarded the work as valuable and its flaws potential for further inquiry rather than major faults.

Historian Paul Gillingham contends that despite Padilla's self-description as post-revisionist, she centers revisionist analysis of "social, political, and economic structures". As such, he claimed it corroborates Jeffrey Rubin's (1997) rejection of mid-century stability as a corporatist myth. He underlined her application of Neo-Gramscian give-and-take analysis in state-society relations, with Padilla recognizing it diminished in the 1940s and calling President Miguel Alemán Valdés "authoritarian". However, he saw her positions occasionally simplistic, depicting Jaramillo against the state in a "David and Goliath" manner. He stated she was part of a "vanguard of scholars" who center violence for the period. He further rejected his reduction to solely resistant, citing Jaramillo's job grant after amnesty; that his integration of women was unique for the time, and the characterization of his militant mobilization as forming focos, reaffirming Eric Hobsbawm's (1952) thesis that it was "collective bargaining by riot" rather than "guerrilla warfare".

- Other reviews:

== See also ==
- Agrarianism in Mexico
- History of Mexico
- Zapatismo
