= Tapaxco =

Town in the State of Mexico, Mexico

Coordinates: 19°47′26″N 100°02′32″W

Tapaxco is a town and ejido in El Oro, State of Mexico, Mexico.

== Description ==
It is approximately 2,800 meters above sea level. Its population is Mazahua-influenced.

Around 900 CE, Tapaxco with Xochtitlan formed Metepec, and although was controlled by the Mexica, included Mazahua, Otomi, and Matlatzincan speakers.

In 1823, Tapaxco was the name originally given to the auxiliary ayuntamiento that seceded from Jocotitlán. However, it was changed to El Oro in accordance with the 1824 Mexican constitution.

In July 2008, President Felipe Calderón's administration granted 5,000 agricultural titles to the community.

== Notable people ==
- Tanalís Padilla – Latin Americanist historian
