= Javier Orihuela García =

Mexican politician

- Born: 23 June 1955 (age 70); Temixco, Morelos, Mexico
- Occupation: Deputy
- Political party: PRD

Javier Orihuela García (born 23 June 1955) is a Mexican politician affiliated with the Party of the Democratic Revolution (PRD). In 2012–2015 he served as a federal deputy in the 62nd Congress, representing the second district of Morelos.
