= Rafael Cuevas =

Mexican footballer (born 1980)

Personal information
- Full name: Rafael Cuevas Sánchez
- Date of birth: June 16, 1980 (age 46)
- Place of birth: Jiutepec, Morelos, Mexico
- Height: 1.75 m (5 ft 9 in)
- Position: Goalkeeper

Team information
- Current team: Club América (gk coach)

Senior career*
Years	Team	Apps	(Gls)
2002–2008	Atlante	28	(0)
2008–2009	Potros Chetumal	19	(0)
- * Club domestic league appearances and goals as of February 16, 2009

Rafael Cuevas Sánchez (born 16 June 1980) is a Mexican retired football goalkeeper. He is currently the goalkeeper coach for Club America's first team under Ricardo LaVolpe.

He is known to teammates and fans as "Higuita", due to his resemblance to Colombian goalkeeper René Higuita.

== Honors ==
=== Club ===
Atlante F.C.

- Apertura 2007

== See also ==
- List of people from Morelos
