= Humanist Party (Mexico) =

Defunct political party in Mexico

Humanist Party Partido Humanista
- Founded: 9 July 2014
- Dissolved: 11 June 2015 (at national level)
- Headquarters: Mexico City, Mexico
- Ideology: Secular humanism
- Political position: Centre
- Colors: Purple

Website
- Official website

The Humanist Party (Spanish: Partido Humanista, PH) is a state-level Mexican political party established in 2014 that was dissolved as a national party in 2015.

The Humanist Party was founded in 2013 and established in 2014. It was created by affiliates of both the PRI and PAN as a centralist party. It wanted people to be represented and a lack of extremism.

== Ideology ==
The Humanist Party was a centralist party and defined itself as a "cross-organization without extremism". With its background in both conservative and liberal parties, it was able to embrace both sides, while keeping their pragmatic, agrarian views. The party was known to be pragmatic and wanted what was best for the nation. With agriculture as their main platform, the Humanists were seen looking to resources and weighing options; usually choosing the best option for the nation.

== Dissolution ==
The Humanist Party suffered the same fate of many small parties in the Mexican political system. In 2015, it was unable to reach the number of votes to keep it as a national party, but it did get enough to remain a regional party. The Humanist Party re-registered as a national party in 2017, but once again, failed to reach its required number of national votes. The Humanist Party was dissolved in 2018.

Jesús Escamilla, the founder of the party and a member of the 53rd Congress of Morelos, died of COVID-19 on January 14, 2021.
