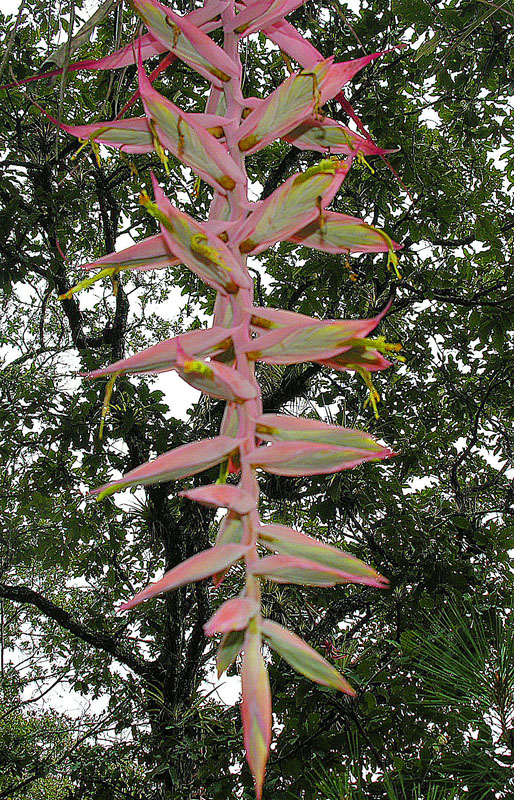

Scientific classification
- Kingdom: Plantae
- Clade: Tracheophytes
- Clade: Angiosperms
- Clade: Monocots
- Clade: Commelinids
- Order: Poales
- Family: Bromeliaceae
- Genus: Tillandsia
- Subgenus: Tillandsia subg. Tillandsia
- Species: T. prodigiosa

Binomial name
- Tillandsia prodigiosa (Lem.) Baker

Synonyms
- Tillandsia hromadnikiana Ehlers; Vriesea prodigiosa Lem.

= Tillandsia prodigiosa =

Species of plant

Tillandsia prodigiosa is a species of flowering plant in the family Bromeliaceae. It is endemic to Mexico.
