= Cocoyoc =

City in Morelos, Mexico

Cocoyoc is a town in the municipality of Yautepec de Zaragoza in the north-central part of the Mexican state of Morelos. It is located at 18°53′N 99°04′W. Cocoyoc reported 10,178 inhabitants in the 2020 census and is the third-largest community in Yautepec.

The name Cocoyoc comes from Nahuatl, meaning ″coyote″.

== History ==
Cocoyoc was founded by the Tlahuicas, the Nahuatl group in the eleventh century, about 200 years before the Aztecs, who would become the dominant group. Huitzilihuitl, the second tlatoani (king) of the Aztecs, conquered Cocoyoc and was impressed by the climate, fertile land and lush vegetation that he married the daughter of the lord of the conquered region.

A Hacienda was built in Cocoyoc in the 16th century by the first viceroy of New Spain, Antonio de Mendoza, as chronicled by Pedro Calderón de la Barca (1600-1681). Ownership of the hacienda changed several times, but by the 18th century it had become one of the twelve most important sugar cane mills in the country. In the early 19th century an aqueduct was built for irrigation; the aqueduct is still functional. It was pillaged during the Mexican Revolution and large parts of it were destroyed; the lands were distributed to peasants. In 1957, Paulino Rivera Torres bought the hacienda and turned it into a luxury hotel. The hotel has restaurants, a spa, and a golf course.
