= Emiliano Zapata, Morelos =

Municipality in Morelos, Mexico

Emiliano Zapata
- City
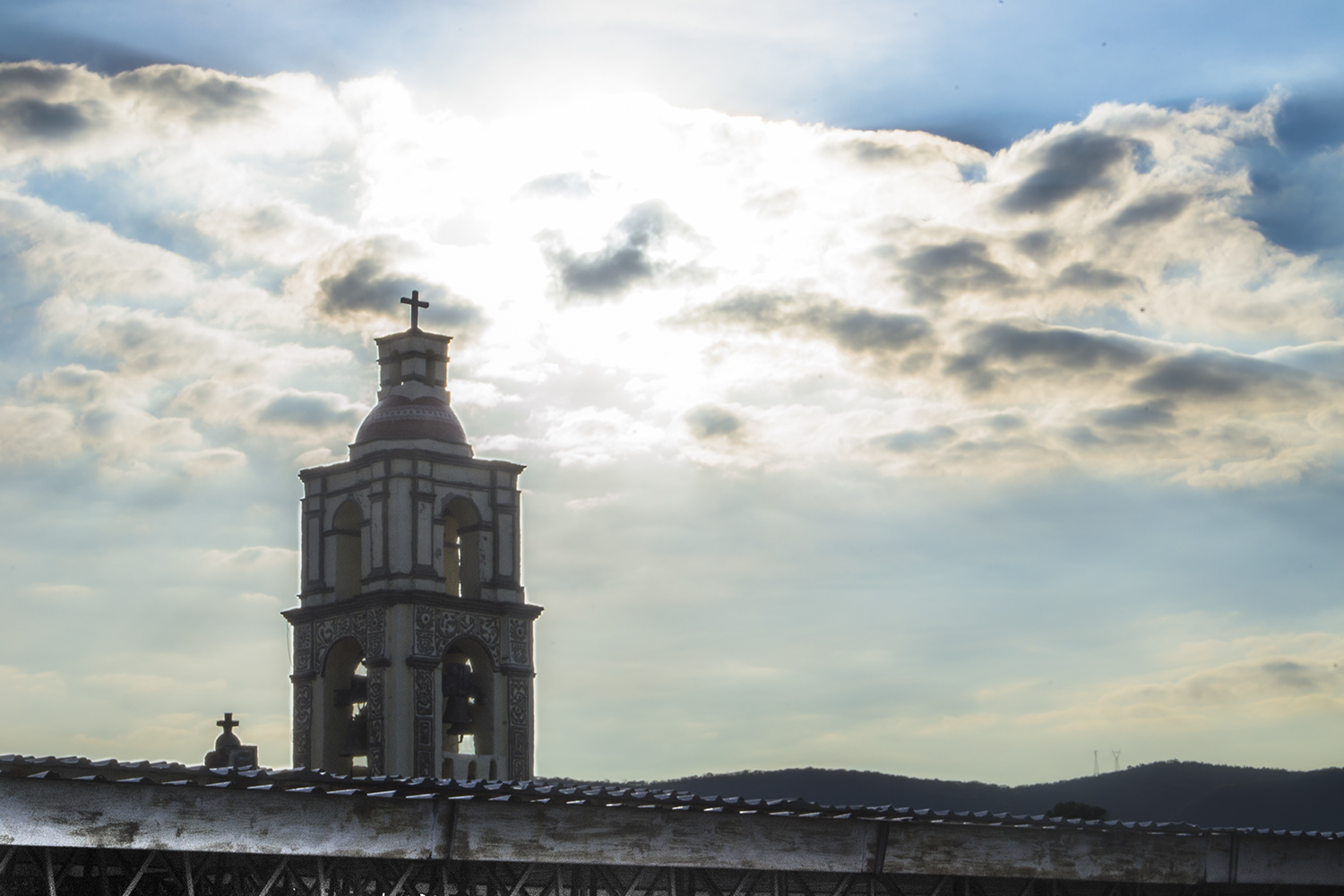
- Parroquia de San Francisco de Asís

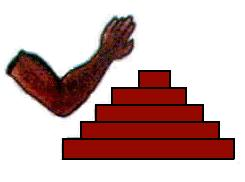
- Coat of arms

- Location within Morelos Location within Mexico
- Coordinates: 18°50′12″N 99°10′55″W
- Country: Mexico
- State: Morelos
- Municipality: Emiliano Zapata
- Named for: Emiliano Zapata

Government
  - Type: Ayuntamiento
- Elevation: 1,249 m (4,098 ft)

Population (2020)
  - Total: 64,084
- Time zone: UTC−6 (CST)

Emiliano Zapata is a city in the west-central part of the Mexican state of Morelos. It stands at 18°52′N 99°09′W. The city serves as the county seat (sede municipal) for the surrounding municipality of the same name. The municipality is the sixth largest in the state of Morelos, with a 2020 census population of 107,053 inhabitants, and has it an area of 64.983 km^{2} (25.09 sq mi). The city of Emiliano Zapata had 64,084 inhabitants in 2020. The city was previously known as both San Francisco Zacualpan and San Vicente Zacualpan. It was renamed in honor of Mexican Revolutionary Emiliano Zapata.

Subsidiary county seats (ayudantias) are: Tres de Mayo, (population 20,950); known principally for its ceramic, Tezoyuca (population 5,501); where a cement factory and a water park are located, Tetecalita (population 3,963), Tepetzingo (population 2,292) and Tetecalita (population 3,963).

== History ==
=== Prehispanic History ===
Oral tradition states that the founders of Tzacualpan were originally from Tepoztlán, Tejalpa, and Xitepeptl (both in modern Jiutepec). It is said that an ambitious peasant fell in love with a royal princess, much to the rage of her father. The young man was forced to pay high tributes and he was forced to move elsewhere, finally settling on a plain between a bald hill and a hill of the gods. With time this area became a part of a powerful lord who fought against the Lord of Cuauhnahuac in 1389.

=== Colonial Period ===
After the conquest in 1521, Hernán Cortés was named Marqués de Oaxaca; his lands included present-day Morelos. In 1534 the territory of Morelos fell under the jurisdiction of the Province of Mexico City. The territory that today makes up the modern municipality of Emiliano Zapata was known as Tzacualpan, and the Spanish added the name San Francisco. Since it was near the Franciscan monastery of Santiago de Xiutepec, this area came to be called San Francisco Tzacualpan. Don Pedro Cortés, 4th Marquess of the Valley of Oaxaca, founded the hacienda of San Vicente Tzacualpan at that time.

In 1618 Diego de Alarcón was granted 170 hectares (420 acres) of land, where he established a rich sugar cane hacienda. This became the center of the town.

=== 19th Century ===
Mexico became independent in 1821, and the present state of Morelos became part of the State of Mexico. In 1840, the town was renamed San Vicente Zacualpan in honor of the hacienda owner, Governor Vicente de Eguia.

In 1856, the hacienda of San Vicente changed hands; owned by Don Pío Bermejillo and administered by his brother, Nicolás. Not far, near the Hill of Sayula, was the Hacienda of Dolores, which was dependent upon San Vicente. The cattle of Trinidad Carrillo, who rented land from Hacienda Dolores, damaged some of the sugar cane of Hacienda Dolores. Nicolás Bermejillo kicked Carrillo off the land, and the latter vowed revenge. Enlisting the aid of Nicolás Leite and Matías Navarrete, on December 18, 1856, they attacked San Vicente and killed four high-ranking men; Bermejillo was not present. In September 1858, the killers were tried for assault, robbery, and murder at the haciendas of Chiconcuac and San Vicente.

Morelos became a state in 1869.

=== 20th century ===
Local residents who fought in the Mexican Revolution (1910-1921) included General Modesto Rangel and the soldiers Ricardo Catalán, Venancio Jiménez, Francisco Mariaca, Natividad Vázquez, Santos Delgado, Teodulo Olivan, Feliciano Flores, Refugio Angelino, Javier Montes De Oca, Martín Batalla, and Aureliano Trujillo.

In 1930 the government decreed that no community could use a saint's name, so San Vicente Zacualpan became Emiliano Zapata in honor of the Revolutionary hero. President Álvaro Obregón made a historic visit in 1922. Post-revolutionary land partitioning ended in 1927.

Governor Vicente Estrada Cajigal established the municipalities Atlatlahucan and Emiliano Zapata on December 15, 1932; the town of Zapata designated the capital of the latter. The villages of Tezoyuca, Tepetzingo, and Tetecalita were part of the municipality.

Drinking water was provided to the community in 1935. The former hacienda of San Vicente was turned over to the people in 1942. The Rice Cooperative was established in 1944, and the San Vicente Agricultural Association was established in 1963.

=== 21st century ===
There were two major earthquakes in 2017. The Chiapas earthquake on September 7 did not cause any damage in Morelos, but the 2017 Puebla earthquake centered in Axochiapan twelve days later killed over 300 people and caused physical damage to 20,000 buildings. In Zapata, 142 homes were destroyed and 248 were damaged.

Ana Olivia Albarran Salazar of PVEM (Green Party) was elected Presidente Municipal (mayor) in the July 1, 2018 election.

The state of Morelos reported 209 cases and 28 deaths due to the COVID-19 pandemic in Mexico, as of April 27, 2020; eight cases were reported in Emiliano Zapata. Schools and many businesses were closed from mid March until June 1. On June 2, Zapata reported 42 confirmed cases and five deaths from the virus; the reopening of the state was pushed back until at least June 13. Emiliano Zapata reported 170 cases, 136 recuperations, and 28 deaths as of August 31. Three hundred fourteen cases were reported on December 27.

Six men were killed and one woman was wounded in a shooting by unknown assailants in Colonia 3 de Mayo on June 6, 2020. Police officer Rodolfo Martínez Sánchez was assassinated in broad daylight in Colonia Tres de Mayo on December 27, 2020, in apparent revenge for a traffic ticket.

=== Famous people ===
The following is a list of famous people from Emiliano Zapata:

- Modesto Rangel, general (1916)
- Gilberto García, Secretary of ejido, municipal president, local deputy
- Gontran Rodríguez, commissioner of ejido of Tezoyuca, political posts in Zacatepec and Cuernavaca
- Diego Álvarez, commissioner of ejido Tezoyuca, President of the Board of the sugar refinery in Zacatepec
- J. Jesús Vega Basurto, commissioner of ejido of Zapata, President of the Board of the sugar refinery
- Feliciano Catalán A, commissioner of ejido, municipal president, president of the board of rice growers in the state
- Vicente Peralta G, commissioner of Tezoyuca, board of directors of the sugar refinery, thrice local deputy
- Teresa Peralta R., doctor, director of IMSS Zapata
- Antonio Aguilar C., commissioner of ejido, municipal president

Municipal presidents, 1933–present

- Apolinar Beltrán Díaz (Board), 1933
- Zeferino Guerrero Barón, 1933-1934
- Domingo Valtierra Acevedo, 1935-1936
- Norberto Anzurez Blancas, 1937-1938
- Santos Delgado Catalán, 1939-1940
- Honorato Vargas Caspeta, 1941-1942
- Refugio Figueroa Tapia, May–December 1942
- J. Santos Delgado Catalán, 1941-1942
- Gilberto Gracia Pacheco, 1943
- Domingo Valtierra Quevedo, 1944
- Isidoro Martínez Aguilar, 1945
- Vicente Aguilar Acevedo (Interim), 1946
- Perfecto Delgado Buenos Aires, 1947-1948
- Feliciano Flores Rodríguez, 1949-1950
- Trinidad Talavera Plascencia, 1951-1952
- Martín Batalla Caspeta, 1953-1954
- Antonio Aguilar Carnalla, 1955-1957
- Feliciano Catalán Avelar, 1958-1959
- Silvano García Quezada, 1959-1960
- Vicente Aguilar Acevedo, 1961-1962
- Timoteo Jiménez Leana, 1962-1963
- Juan Álvarez Domínguez, 1964-1966
- Daniel Delgado Beltrán, 1967-1970
- Juan Alvarez Domínguez, 1970-1973
- Moisés Ocampo Uribe (Board), 1973-1976
- Humberto Esquivel Castañeda, 1976-1979
- Jacinto Alonso Piedra, 1979-1982
- Juan Esquivel Castañeda, 1982-1985
- Julio Jarrillo Cabello, 1985-1988
- M.V.S Lauro Muñoz Esquivel, 1988-1991
- Bernardo Oliveros Hernández, 1991-1994
- Rogelio Mariaca Bustos, 1994-1997 (PRI)
- Arq. Rodolfo Esquivel Landa, 1997-2000 (PAN)
- Francisco Alva Meraz, 2000-2003 (PAN)
- Martín Caballero Enriquez, 2003-2006 (PAN)
- José Fernando Aguilar Palma, 2006-2009 (PRD)
- Alberto Figueroa Valladares, 2009–2012, (PRD)
- Carlos Martíneaz Varela, 2013-2015 (PRD-PT-Convergence)
- José Fernando Aguilar Palma, 2016-2018
- Ana Olivia Albarran Salazar, 2019–present (PVEM)

== Geography ==
=== Location, area, and land use ===
Emiliano Zapata is one of 36 municipalities the state of Morelos, located in the center of the state at 18°50′12″N 99°10′55″W Emiliano Zapata borders the municipalities of Temixco and Jiutepec to the north; Jiutepec, Yautepec, and Tlaltizapán to the east; Tlaltizapán and Xochitepec to the south; Xochitepec and Temixco to the west. It has an area of 68.37 km^{2}, 1.4% of the total territory of Morelos. 3,362 hectares are used for agriculture, 1,196 hectares for livestock, 930 hectares for forests and 16 hectares for industrial use. 3,168 hectares are ejido property, 508 hectares are communal property, and 466 private hectares are privately owned.

=== Climate ===
Emiliano Zapata has a tropical climate, Aw according to the Köppen climate classification. Summers have much more rain than winters. The temperature averages 23.2 °C (°F) and rainfall averages 917 mm per year. May is the hottest month and January is the coldest.

=== Relief and waterways ===
The municipality is located between two hills: Montenegro on the east and Texcal on the west. The highest elevation is Cueva del Aire hill with an altitude of 1,650 meters (5,413 ft.) above sea level. Sierra Madre del Sur has an altitude of 1,240 meters.

Las Fuentes River and a branch of the Apatlaco River flow from north to south. The Agua Salada River and the Yautepec River also cross the municipality. Other streams are Palo Blanco, La Rosa and Roque. There are five large wells.

=== Flora and fauna ===
Vegetation is mostly low deciduous forest of warm climate; higuerilla, black amate (acacia), guaje, jarilla, cactus, and carriage. Jacaranda, tabachin, casahuate, ceiba, and bougainvillea are common.

Mammals include skunk, rabbit, hare, cacomixtle, opossum, bat, badger, armadillo, and coyote. These last three in danger of extinction. Birds include flag bird, chachalaca, magpie, buzzard, crow, and owl.

=== Natural resources ===
Limestone serves as raw material for lime and cement factories.

== Economy ==
Emiliano Zapata is largely agricultural with 1,282 hectares of irrigated land and 120 hectares of rainfed agriculture. The most important crops are sugarcane, rice, corn, beans, peanuts, squash, alfalfa, floriculture, and greenhouses. Another sector that contributes to the economy is livestock through the production of cattle, pigs, sheep, goats, and horses. The industrial sector developed in recent years, making a large part of the municipal territory is considered an important area for trade and services. Given this, it must be said that the construction industry has shown outstanding growth in Emiliano Zapata, which is due to the development of subdivisions and condominiums of medium and residential type.

There are more than 400 wineries and commercial premises of all kinds that offer services, such as grocery stores, furniture stores, pharmacies, clothing, hardware stores, materials for construction, stationery, food, restaurants, hotels, and more. The tourism sector is small, but ceramics and handicrafts are sold.
