= Rubén Jaramillo =

Mexican military and political leader

Rubén Jaramillo in an undated photo

Rubén Jaramillo Méndez (1900 – May 23, 1962) was a Mexican military and political leader of campesino origin who participated in the Mexican Revolution. After the Revolution, he continued to fight for the land reform promised under the Mexican Constitution.

== Mexican Revolution ==
Jaramillo was born in Tlaquiltenango, Morelos, in 1900. When he was 15 years old, he joined the Liberation Army of the South under the direct command of Emiliano Zapata. By age 17, Jaramillo had been promoted to the rank of captain and commanded 75 men.

During the 1920s and 1930s, Jaramillo advocated on behalf of ejidos, grants of communally owned land by the federal government to farmers. He supported the 1934 presidential campaign of Lázaro Cárdenas, who created a cooperative sugar mill in Zacatepec in 1938 at Jaramillo's urging. Jaramillo was elected by the workers to help run the mill, but his advocacy on behalf of the workers led to frequent clashes with administrators appointed by the government.

== Jaramillista movement ==
When workers at the Zacatepec sugar mill went on strike in 1943, Jaramillo persuaded the campesinos to stop producing cane for the mill. The state government ordered his arrest, so Jaramillo fled to the mountains and took up arms against the government. He and his followers, known as Jaramillistas, briefly took control of Tlaquiltenango. In 1944, President Manuel Ávila Camacho invited Jaramillo to Mexico City to negotiate an end to the fighting. Ávila granted amnesty to the Jaramillistas and guaranteed their safety.

For the next nine years, Jaramillo fought for land reform within the electoral system. He founded the Agrarian Labor Party of Morelos (Partido Agrario Obrero Morelense, or PAOM), which quickly had 15,000 members. Jaramillo ran as its candidate for governor of Morelos in 1946 and 1952. Jaramillo lost both times, although he and his followers disputed the official election results.

In 1953, Jaramillo again led an armed revolt against the government. For the next five years he and the Jaramillistas eluded the army. The army brought cavalry and artillery against the rebels, and it was assisted by the air force. Finally, amnesty was negotiated with President Adolfo López Mateos in 1958.

López Mateos had promised Jaramillo he would support the campesinos of Morelos, but Jaramillo was soon disappointed. When cattle ranchers began to take the land previously granted as ejidos, the federal government did nothing. Jaramillo led thousands of farmers in resistance. Jaramillo attempted to negotiate with the government on their behalf. While the government delayed, the campesinos occupied the land illegally. The government asked Jaramillo to help remove the squatters while the legal process continued; most of the farmers agreed. When the federal government ultimately turned down the farmers' request for assistance, Jaramillo appealed to López Mateos but the president refused to meet with him. In 1961, the campesinos again occupied the land. This time, the army removed them.

== Death ==
On May 23, 1962, Jaramillo's home was raided by a group of Federal Judicial Police and soldiers. He, his wife Epifanía, and his three stepsons were taken to Xochicalco, Morelos, where they were killed. The only surviving member of the family was a stepdaughter, who had fled to ask the town's mayor for help.

A few days after the murders, Carlos Fuentes went to Xochicalco and wrote an article that was published in Siempre!, a popular magazine:

They pushed him down. Jaramillo could not hold himself back, he was a lion of the field, that man.... He threw himself at the party of murderers; he was defending his wife and his children, and especially the unborn child; they brought him down with their rifle butts, they knocked out an eye. Epifanía flung herself on the murderers; they tore her rebozo, they tore her dress, they threw her on the stones. [One son] cursed at them; they opened fire and he doubled over and fell beside his pregnant mother, on the stones. While he was still alive, they opened his mouth, picked up fistfuls of earth, pulled open his mouth and laughing filled it with earth. After that it went fast; [the other sons] fell riddled with bullets; the submachine guns spat on the five fallen bodies. The squad waited for them to stop breathing. But they went on living. They put their pistols to the foreheads of the woman and the four men. They fired the finishing shots.

Jaramillo's death was news around the world. He became a folk hero. Villages and schools were named after him. The article by Fuentes was widely reprinted. U.S. singer-songwriter Phil Ochs wrote the song "Bullets of Mexico" about Jaramillo. Nobody was charged with the killings.

== See also ==
- Comando Jaramillista Morelense 23 de Mayo
