= Yautepec, Morelos =

Municipality in Morelos, Mexico

Yautepec
- Municipality
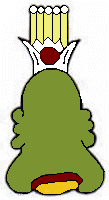
- Coat of arms

- Location in Mexico
- Coordinates: 18°53.9′N 99°3.38′W
- Country: Mexico
- State: Morelos
- Demonym: (in Spanish)
- Time zone: UTC−6 (CST)

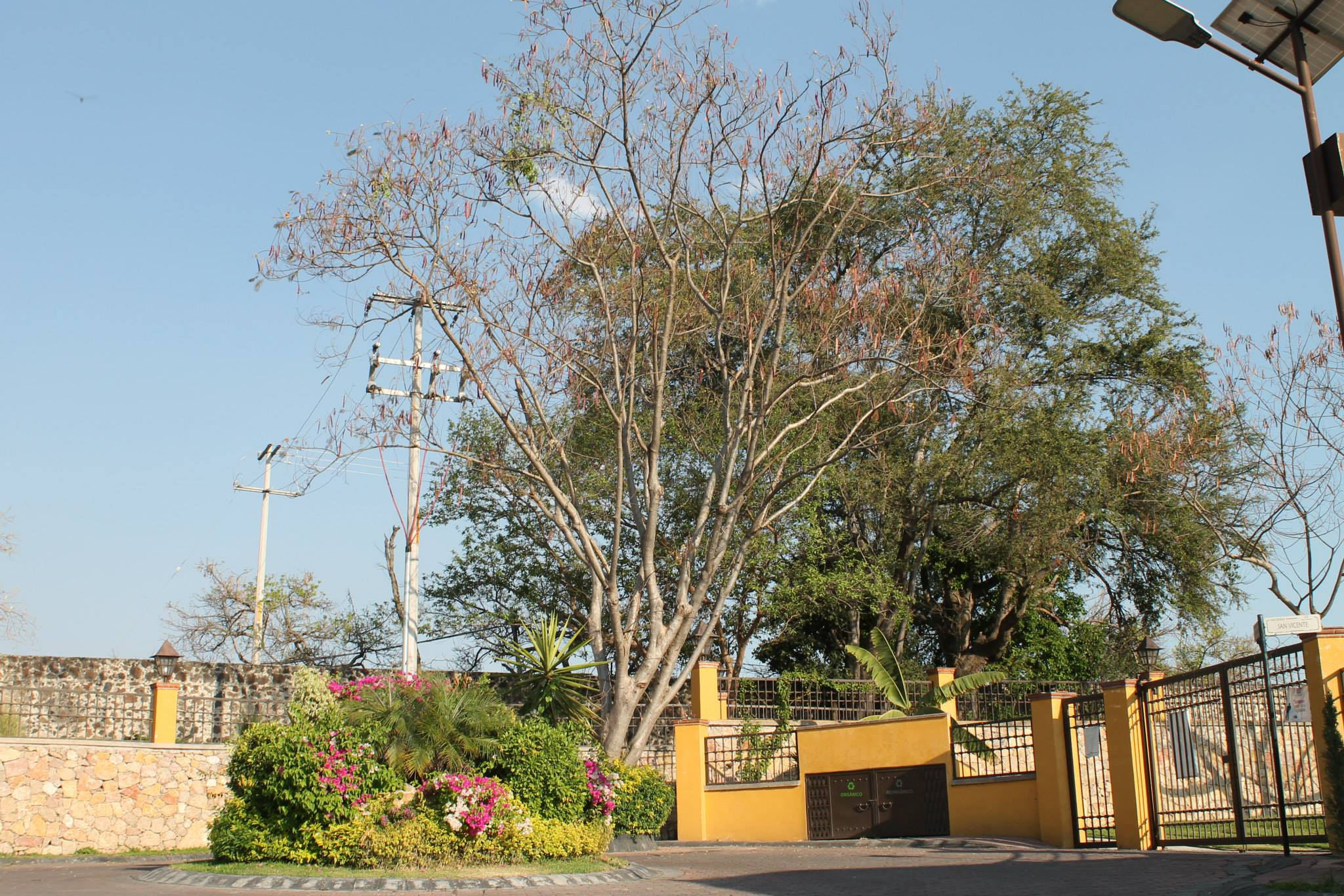
Roadside scene in Yautepec de Zaragoza

Yautepec is a municipality located in the north-central part of the Mexican state of Morelos. The municipal seat is the city of Yautepec de Zaragoza. It stands at 18°53′N 99°04′W.

The city serves as the municipal seat for the surrounding municipality of Yautepec. In the 2020 census the municipality had a population of 105,780, the fifth-largest community in the state in population (after Cuernavaca, Jiutepec, Cuautla, and Temixco). The municipality, which has an area of 203 km^{2} (78 sq mi) reported 102,690 inhabitants in the 2015 census. Yautepec de Zaragoza had 44,353 inhabitants in 2020.

Other large towns in the municipality are La Joya (population 14,126), Cocoyoc (population 10,178), Oaxtepec (population 7,097), Los Arcos (San Carlos) (population 5,736), Oacalco (population 2,543), Lázaro Cárdenas (El Empalme) (population 1,503), Itzamatitlán (population 1,366), Corral Grande (population 1,189), San Isidro (population 1,153), Ignacio Bastida (Santa Catarina Tlayca) (population 1,119), and La Nopalera (population 1,005).

Yautepec, has its etymological roots derived from Yautli: Bright-colored plant with an aniseed flavor and yellow flowers in bouquets that indigenous people used for cleansing baths; Tepe-tl: (hill) and "k" contraction of Ko: (adverb of place); it means "On the hill of the pericón flower" in English. President Benito Juarez changed the name from La villa de Yautepec de Gómez Farías to Yautepec de Zaragoza (of Zaragoza) in 1869 in honor of General Ignacio Zaragoza, the general who had led the Cinco de Mayo, 1862, victory over the invading French forces in Puebla.

== History ==
The mythical love story of Popocatépetl and Iztaccihuatl is well-known. What is less known is that the princess's father preferred she date the King of Yautepec, which she did on at least one occasion.

=== Prehispanic history ===
Francisco Plancarte y Navarrete, Cuernavaca's second bishop (1898–1911), wrote Tamoanchan—El Estado de Morelos y El Principio de la Civilizacion en Mexico in 1911. In it, he proposes that the first agriculturally based settlements in Mexico appeared around 1500 BCE in a place called Tamoanchan which he associates with Morelos. While later archaeologists do not mention Tamoanchan, the remains of an elephant-like animal dating back 6,000 years, have been found near Yautepec. These remains can be seen at the Museo Regional Cuauhnahuac (Palace of Cortes) in Cuernavaca.

The earliest findings are on the hill of Atlihuayán; the first settlers in the region were the Olmec. The Olmec were nomads, living from hunting, fishing, as well as gathering roots and wild fruit. Archaeologists Valentín López González and Ramón Piña Chan, have found an Atlihuayan figurine, now exhibited in the National Museum of Anthropology and History in Mexico City. Also, nine pyramids and a ball court have been found in Itzamatitlán.

Yautepec and the entire Morelos Valley had a subordinate role in Mesoamerican history. From the Classic to the Postclassic the local populations developed under the influence of Teotihuacanos, Toltecas and Nahuas. It is with these last ones that the Valley had a greater relevance in the regional dynamics, since it was occupied by Tlahuica population (Nahuatl language speakers), taking Cuauhnahuac (Cuernavaca) as its capital and expanding its dominion to other zones, including Yautepec. In 1389, the inhabitants of Yautepec, Tetlama, and Jiutepec, fought the Tlahuicas.

After the establishment of the Triple Alliance in 1438, the Tlahuica lordship was conquered and forced to pay tribute to the Mexicas. When Moctezuma I ascended the throne, he set about conquering Yautepec, forcing them to submit to the Lord of Tenochtitlan. Moctezuma built a botanical garden in Huaxtepec (Oaxtepec) in (1440–1469).

=== Conquest & colonization ===
The conquest of Morelos by the conquistadors under Hernán Cortés was part of the strategy to achieve the ultimate goal: the fall of the Great Tenochtitlán.

Upon the arrival of the Spaniards, the Indigenous groups of the region were divided into two cacicazgos: Cuauhnahuac and Huaxtepec. The conquistador sent an expedition to take the town of Ocuituco; later Gonzalo de Sandoval was sent to Yecapixtla. A year later, 1521, Cortes explored the lands submitted by Sandoval, then went to Tlalmanalco and Huaxtepec. After some bloody fights and some peaceful deliveries, including Yautepec, Morelos fell into Spanish hands. Cortes made peace with the Caciques in this area prior to his Siege of Tenochtitlan.

Once the military conquest was complete, catechization was carried out by Dominican friars, who began the construction of the convent of the Ascension of the Lord in 1567. It stands out for its simplicity and austerity. This large building is unlike many others, simple in its spatial solutions and form in façade, nave of the temple, tower, and convent cloister. The church is rectangular, long, tall and rather narrow, interrupted in its length by two lateral chapels. The building has a popular Renaissance character. The choral window on the façade is rectangular and possibly the largest one of any 16th-century churches in the state. There is a large but simple bell tower in the southwest corner. The convent emphasizes the austerity and simplicity of the home or abode of the friars. There are no luxuries, no ornamentation and here lies the beauty of this set. On the southeast side is the large open chapel, perhaps the largest of the Indian chapels in the state. This chapel is beautiful although it is semi-destroyed and abandoned.

The Dominican convent of Santo Domingo in Oaxtepec was founded by Fray Vicente de Sta. Ma. and Fray Domingo in 1533; it was the first built by that order in Morelos. This church does not have an atrium, and it was built on top of a prehispanic base some three or four meters above the level of the plaza. Both of these monasteries were recognized by the UNESCO as World Heritage Sites in 1994, and are included in the Ruta de los Conventos.

While cotton was the most important crop in the pre-conquest era, sugar replaced cotton after the conquest. The sugar cane haciendas of Cocoyoc and Atlihuayán were built in the 17th century. Cocoyoc is a Nahuatl word that means "place of coyotes". The city of Cocoyoc was founded in the 11th century by the Tlahuicas. After the conquest, Hernán Cortés was named Marquis of Oaxaca in recognition of his services to the Spanish crown. Cortés also married Isabel, daughter of Moctezuma II. In 1614, the Hacienda received a license from the government to establish a sugar factory pulled by horses, in order to grind and process sugarcane. Elviro Ruiz, a descendant of Isabel, sold part of her inheritance to the peasants as farmland, but the hacienda later increased its lands through purchases, negotiations, and marriages. In 1698, the Hacienda consisted of three hundred and sixty-six hectares of irrigated land, a house, a chapel, the trapiche (mill) and other buildings necessary for the operation of a sugar plantation. However, it was later reduced by forced sales by fines of tax evasion and other debts, and on more than one occasion the entire property was auctioned off. During the 18th century, Hacienda Cocoyoc was one of the twelve most important sugar mills in the country and by then it had already had numerous owners.

=== Independence & 19th century ===
The haciendas established at Oacalco, Apanquetzalco, Atlihuayán, San Carlos Borromeo, Cocoyoc and Xochimancas generally prospered into the 19th century, and the Mexican War of Independence (1810–1821) had little direct effect on the lives of the people of Yautepec.

Once Mexico achieved its independence, Yautepec became a community in the district of Cuautla de las Ampilpas in the State of Mexico. Over the next 40+ years, the country suffered through power struggles between conservatives (who favored a strong central government) and liberals (who favored a federated government) as well as several foreign invasions. In 1854 this led to the Plan de Cuernavaca which led to the ouster of dictator Antonio Santa Anna and in 1857 the Plan de Ayutla and civil war. Yautepec in 1861-1862 is the fictional setting of El Zarco, a novel about bandits called Los Plateados written by Ignacio Manuel Altamirano and published after his death in 1901. The reality relating to the bandits who thrived during this time of anarchy, however, may not have been as thrilling and romantic as Altamirano suggests.

The town was briefly called, la Villa de Yautepec de Gomez Farias in honor of one of the signers of the Plan de Cuernavaca. After the French invasion and the Republic was restored, Morelos became a state in 1869 and Yautepec became a municipality. The city of Yautepec changed its name to Yautepec de Zaragoza in honor of general Ignacio Zaragoza, hero of the Battle of Puebla. There is a bust of Zaragoza in La Plazuela de Leyva in the town center. The plaza itself is named for Francisco Leyva, first Governor of Morelos as Yautepec became the first capital of the state (April 17, 1869). Leyva created the Literary and Scientific Institute of the State of Morelos with preparatory studies in agriculture and veterinary science; trade and administration; Arts and crafts; normal for teachers; and law. A telegraph line between Cuernavaca and Yautepec was laid in 1877 during the administration of Governor Carlos Pacheco.

Peace was restored under the dictatorship of Porfirio Diaz, bringing prosperity to large landowners such as the Escandon family, who had belonged to the court of Emperor Maximilian.

The actress Virginia Fábregas García was born in the Hacienda de Oacalco in the municipality of Yautepec on December 17, 1871. She was the daughter of Ricardo Fábregas of Spanish origin and of Mrs. Ursula García de Figueroa. Her vocation for the theater was manifested from adolescence when the owner of the Hacienda de Apanquetzalco built a theater in the municipal seat which was a silent witness to the first artistic steps of the talented Virginia. As for the hacienda, it went bankrupt and its lands were bought by the Escandon family.

=== 20th & 21st centuries ===
One person died and the church was damaged during the September 19, 2017 earthquake.

Agustín Alonso Gutiérrez (PRD-PSD) was elected Presidente Municipal (mayor) in the July 2018 election.

Morelos had its first case of infection during the COVID-19 pandemic in Mexico in mid-March, about the same time that Mexico entered Phase 2 of the pandemic and schools were closed. Mayor Agustín Alonso Gutiérrez announced on March 24 that he and other municipal authorities would donate half their salaries for buy food for low-income families in Yautepec. As of April 20, 2020, there were 12 deaths and 95 confirmed cases in the state, including one death and five cases in Yautepec, numbers that increased to 1,238 cases in the state with 248 deaths on May 25; Yautepec had 26 cases. The state office of DIF sent food and water to vulnerable groups of people in eight municipalities including Yautepec on May 26. On July 2, Yautepec reported 24 infections and five deaths from the virus; the reopening of the state was pushed back until at least June 13. Yautepec reported 178 cases, 135 recuperations, and 35 deaths from the virus as of August 31. Three hundred thirty cases were reported on December 27, 2020. Yautepec reported 462 cases on January 14, 2021, sixth highest in the state.

== Tourism, points of interest, culture ==
=== Water parks ===
Due to its pleasant climate and abundant, clean water, there are several water parks in Yautepec:

- Balneario Los Robles (swimming pools, wading pool, store, green areas, tables with umbrellas)
- Balneario Mares (campground, green area, swimming pools, water slides, restaurant, playground, store, wading pool, tables & chairs)
- Balneario Delfines Yautepec (swimming pools wading pool, fronton, restaurant, camping area, cabins, green areas)
- Los Ciruelos (swimming pools, wading pool, playground, green spaces)
- Balneario Santa Isabel, Tlaltizapán (spring water is 23 °C; swimming pools, water slides, cabins, hotel, "Gotcha," artificial lake, restaurant)
- Balneario Ejidal El Bosque, Oaxtepec. Said to be the actual site of Moctezuma Iluhicamina's rest home. (swimming pools, water slide, blue pool, cabins, campground, hanging bridge, archaeological monuments)
- Restaurante y Balneario Los Arcos (water park & restaurant)
- Balneario Chilsoleate, San Isidro. (Campground, swimming pools, water slides, diving pool, store, temazcal, grills, ATVs, music on weekends)
- Balneario Itzamatitlan, Itzamatitlán. (Olympic pool, wading pool, restaurant, 10 cabins, campground, green area, orchard with fruit trees, spring with thermal water, spring with cold water. The Yautepec River flows there.
- Parque El Jagüey, Los Caracoles, Ejido de Yautepec.
- Six Flags Hurricane Harbor, Oaxtepec. This is probably the most complete and most modern water park in Latin America.

=== Colonial monuments & churches ===
- Former monastery of Santo Domingo Félix de Guzmán in Oaxtepec, built by the Dominican Order between 1528 and 1580.
- Parish of La Asunción in Rancho Nuevo, constructed 1554–1567 by Friar Lorenzo.
- Chapel of Barrio de Santiago
- Church of Barrio de Ixtlahuacán
- Chapel of Barrio de San Juan
- Hacienda of Oacalco
- Hacienda of Apanquetzalco
- Hacienda of Atlihuayán
- Hacienda of San Carlos Borromeo
- Hacienda of Cocoyoc, resort hotel
- Hacienda of Xochimancas

=== Fiestas, music, dance, handicrafts ===
Carnival (Spanish: Carnaval) in Yautepec lasts four days: Friday, Saturday, Sunday, and Monday (in 2019, March 3–6). There are several parades, bands, chinelos (dancers), and of course food.

== In popular culture ==
=== Movies ===
Numerous national and international movies have been filmed in Yautepec. About 70 movies were filmed there during the Golden Age of Mexican cinema (1933–1964); Oacalco, Oaxtepec, and Cocoyoc were the most popular locations within the municipality.

Scenes from The Magnificent Seven (1960), directed by John Sturges and starring Yul Brynner, Eli Wallach, Steve McQueen, Charles Bronson, Robert Vaughn, Brad Dexter, James Coburn, and Horst Buchholz were filmed in Oacalco.

Parts of Under the Volcano (1984 film) (1984–1985), directed by John Huston and starring Albert Finney, Jacqueline Bisset, Anthony Andrews, and Katy Jurado, based on the 1947 novel by Malcolm Lowry were filmed in Oacalco.

== See also ==
- History of Morelos, Conquest and Revolution
- Monasteries on the slopes of Popocatépetl
- List of people from Morelos
