= Jiutepec =

City in Morelos, Mexico

- City and Municipality
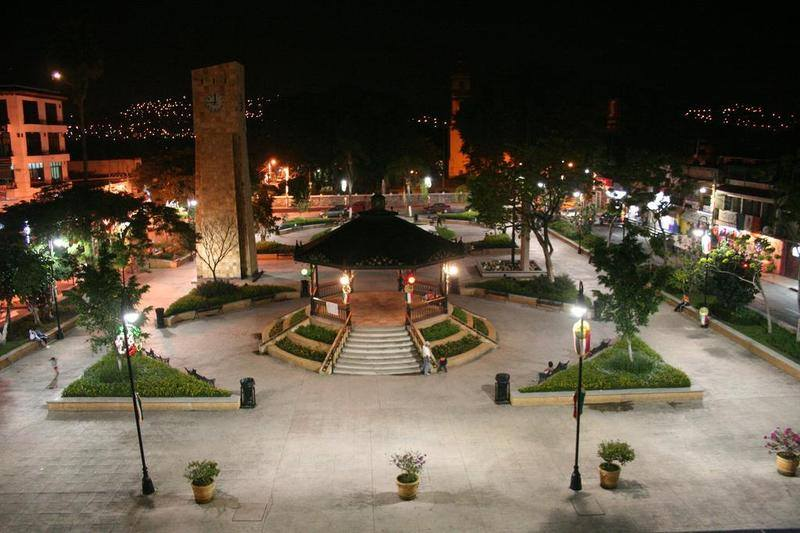

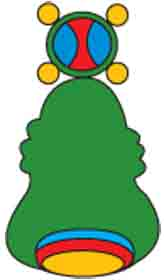
- Coat of arms

- Location within Mexico Location within Morelos
- Coordinates: 18°53′0″N 99°10′0″W
- Country: Mexico
- State: Morelos
- Municipal Status: 17 March 1826

Area
  - Total: 70.45 km^{2} (27.20 sq mi)
- Elevation: 1,355 m (4,446 ft)

Population (2020)
  - Total: 215,357
  - Density: 3,057/km^{2} (7,917/sq mi)
- Time zone: UTC−6 (CST)
- Postal Code: 62550 - 62578
- Website: jiutepec.gob.mx

Jiutepec is a city and its surrounding municipality in the Mexican state of Morelos.

The name Jiutepec comes from the Nahuatl name Xiutepetl, which means "the precious stones hill".

The city serves as the municipal seat for the surrounding municipality of the same name. Over recent decades Jiutepec has merged into neighboring Cuernavaca so that on its northeasterly edges it forms one geographically contiguous urban area with the latter. The Cuernavaca metropolitan area not only includes these two municipalities, but also Temixco, Emiliano Zapata, Xochitepec, and Tepoztlán municipalities, for a total population of 1,027,562 (February 2018 figure also includes Huitzilac and Tlaltizapán).

According to the 2015 census the city of Jiutepec had a population of 153,704 while the municipality reported 214,137 inhabitants. The city and the municipality rank second in population in the state, behind the city and municipality of Cuernavaca. The municipality has an area of 70.45 km^{2} (27.20 sq mi).

== History ==
=== Prehispanic history ===
Nauhuatl-speaking people arrived in the state of Morelos in the 12th and 13th centuries, where they formed large, important domains such as "Xiutépetl." In A.D. 1389, Xiutépetl fought a war against Cuauhanauhuac, Tetlama, and Yautepec. In 1425, Aztec emperor Ixcóatl conquered Jiutepec.

=== Conquest & colonialism ===
Jiutepec amassed troops to fight Hernán Cortés on April 11, 1521, but they were defeated. Cortes rested for two days in Jiutepec before attacking Cuernavaca on April 13. During the colonial period, Jiutepec came under the jurisdiction of the Marquesado del Valle de Oaxaca. During the colonial period, four haciendas (San Gaspar, Atlacomulco, Dolores, and San Vicente) and several sugar mills were established. In 1807 there was a rebellion against don Vicente Eguía, and his lands were given to the people of Leyva.

=== Independence & 19th century ===
After Mexican War of Independence, upon creation of the State of Mexico, Jiutepec became a municipality in the District of Cuernavaca. There were constant conflicts between the haciendas and the peasants over land and water during the 19th century. Hacienda San Vincente put so much pressure on the people of Amatitlan that they had to abandon their town; in 1852 the governor of the State of Mexico seized lands from the people of Jietepec to give to the Hacienda of Atlacomulco.

=== Revolution & 20th century ===
Inhabitants of Jiutepec were extensively involved in the Mexican Revolution of 1910. In 1914 the Hacienda of Atlacomulco served as headquarters for the Army of Liberation during the Siege of Cuernavaca. El Texcal was the scene of numerous battles. The town of Jiutepec was burned by federal troops in retaliation on May 8, 1916; 225 revolutionaries were summarily judged and shot by (Carrancist) General Rafael Cepeda (El Democrata May 10, 1916; cited in the book Zapata y la Revolución Mexicana.

By 1932 land was redistributed in the form of ejidos (collective farmland). The municipality of Emiliano Zapata broke off Jiutepec on December 15, 1932, and Temixco broke off on March 3, 1933. The town of Progreso was founded in March, 1934, and there is a carnaval with Chinelos to celebrate. The colonia Agrícola Militar de José G. Parres was founded by veteran Zapatistas in the 1930s.

Many people of Jiutepec supported peasant leader Rubén Jaramillo in the 1950s and 1960s, and hundreds from Jiutepec attended his funeral in 1962.

In 1966 the Ciudad Industrial del Valle de Cuernavaca (CIVAC) was established. This industrial city was in conflict with the traditions of the municipality with little benefit in return, as the federal government decreed that industries established in the city would be exempt from taxes for thirty years. 4,000 hectares were expropriated from communal land in Tejalpa, without resistance based on promises that still have not been completed.

=== 21st century ===
Jiutepec suffered considerably during the September 19, 2017 Puebla earthquake. Four people died and many buildings, were damaged.

Rafael Reyes Reyes of Juntos Haremos Historia (Together we will make history coalition) was elected Presidente Municipal (mayor) in the election of July 1, 2018. On February 17, 2020, a large, publicly displayed manta (banner) accused Reyes Reyes of ties to Los Linos drug cartel.

Violence continues to effect Jiutepec. On February 23, 2019, between 15 and 20 armed robbers interrupted a party in Jardín Real Quinta Búhos, robbed the party-goers of their things, and stole at least twelve cars. Delfino Sánchez Zavala, the delegate-elect from Tejalpa, was shot and killed on March 30, 2019. The meeting of the town council planned for Sunday, March 31 was canceled.

Rafael Reyes Reyes, Municipal President, announced on May 20, 2019 that Jiutepec has a debt of MXN $745,341,125 (US $39.2 million), which is MXN $95 million more than its annual income.

The state of Morelos reported 209 cases and 28 deaths due to the COVID-19 pandemic in Mexico, as of April 27, 2020, 14 cases were reported in Jiutepec. Schools and many businesses were closed from mid March until June 1. On June 2, Jiutepec reported 97 confirmed cases and 18 deaths from the virus; the reopening of the state was pushed back until at least June 13. Despite the fact that Morelos was classified ″Red Semaphore,″ the auto industry was classified ″essential″ and all 2,600 employees at the Nissan plant in Civac returned to work on June 11, 2020. As infections passed 4,000 and deaths 900 in August, Jiutepec did little to prevent the spread of the virus and allowed large weddings wherein guests were not required to use face masks. Jiutepec reported 510 cases, 401 recuperations, and 83 deaths from the virus as of August 31. One thousand, twenty-nine cases were reported on December 27, 2020.

== Communities ==
- Jiutepec is the municipal seat. It has 162,427 inhabitants and is situated at an altitude of 1,355 meters (4,446 ft.) It is 8 km (5 miles) southeast of Cuernavaca and 96.1 km (59.7 miles) south of Mexico City.
- Progreso has 14,525 inhabitants and is situated at an altitude of 1,354 meters. It is 4.3 km (2.7 miles) southeast of Jiutepec.
- Independencia has 7,282 inhabitants and is situated at an altitude of 1,409 meters (4,623 ft.) It is 7.2 km east of Jiutepec. *Calera Chica has a population of 5,392 and is located at an altitude of 1,318 meters. It is 6.2 km (3.9 miles) south of Jiutepec.
- Cliserio Alanís (San Gaspar) has 2,092 inhabitants and is situated at an altitude of 1,307 meters. It is 3.3 km (2.1 miles) southeast of Jiutepec.
- Tejalpa is 2.5 km (1.6 miles) north of Jiutepec.
- Tetecoala is 5.1 km (3.2 miles) north of the municipal seat.

== Notable people ==
- Cliserio Alanís Tapia, Revolutionary general born in San Gaspar. He died ambushed by Carrancista forces on March 12, 1918.
- Cuautzinten, tlatoani of Xiutepec, defeated by Tezcapotzin of Cuauhnáhuac
- Rafael Cuevas Sánchez (b. 1980 in Jiutepec) is a retired football goalkeeper. He is currently the goalkeeper coach for Club America.
- Pioquinto Galis, Revolutionary general born in Tlalquitenango. He was one of the ten companions of Zapata in the hacienda of Chinameca. He founded the agricultural colony José G. Parres and worked the land until he died.
- Celestino Carnalla, colonel who joined Zapata in 1911 and retired in 1924. He became a farmer and died July 24, 1938.
- Juan Francisco Miranda (June 20, 1720 in Atlacomulco-1759 in Rome), Jesuit writer
- Benito Pichardo, colonel who was born in Jiutepec and was Zapata's courier.
- Estanislao Tapia Chávez, (May 7, 1901 – March 9, 1998). He served during the Mexican Revolution under the orders of Próculo Capistrán, participated in the first uprising of Rubén Jaramillo in 1949, and was a founding member of the Coordinadora Nacional Plan Ayala. In 1982 he was a candidate for governor for the Partido Socialista Unificado de México (PSUM). In August 1994, he traveled to the jungle of Chiapas to meet Subcomandante Marcos and give him a copy of the Plan de Ayala.

== Points of interest ==
El Texcal water park features water slides, swimming pools, diving pool, locker rooms, parking, restaurant, guided visits to the ecological zone, and mountain biking route. Opened in 1992 and located in Tejalpa along the Cuernavaca-Cuautla highway. Balnario Ejidal Las Fuentes is a small water park with swimming pools and water slides located not far from downtown Jiutepec, Paseo de las Fuentes s/n, Pedregal de Las Fuentes.

The Mexican colonial period glows in an old 16th-century sugar hacienda, founded by Hernán Cortés in 1530. Known as San Antonio Atlacomulco, or Ex-Hacienda de Cortes this architectural piece of art is an example of the era of the conquest, its legends engraved in its great dry-stone walls and its historic past enveloped in lush vegetation and crystal-clear running water. Today it is a hotel/restaurant/spa located in Colonia Atlacomulco.

Hacienda San Gaspar was built by Martín Cortés, son of the conqueror, in the 16th century. Today it hosts special events such as weddings. The chapel is open to the public for religious services. There is also an 18-hole, 7,000-yard golf course designed by Joe Finger. golf club

The church of Santiago Apóstol is located in downtown Jiutepec. It is a former 16th-century Franciscan Convent with an 18th-century Baroque retable (altar) that was restored in 1998. There are also frescos on the walls of the cloister and a painting of Cristo Negro (Black Christ) from the 18th century. Santiago's festival is July 25.

Colonial churches dedicated to San Miguel, San Pedro, and the Assumption can be found in Tejalpa. There is a festival on August 15.

Camino Real Sumiya is a hotel/restaurant styled after a Japanese tea house. It has a Zen garden and a Kabuki theater that is a replica of the one in Kyoto. The hotel was originally the home of Barbara Hutton, the "poor little rich girl" who inherited the Woolworth five-and-dime fortune.web page in English

There is a Carnaval on the 4th Friday of January in Jiutepec and another in Tejalpa after Ash Wednesday. In Tejalpa they also celebrate the Feast of St. Luke on October 18 by making an offering in a spring. Visitors are offered free food.

Green mole, mole de pipían and red mole with turkey, green sauce, and guajes make up traditional foods.

== Economy ==
The most important economic activity is manufacturing. Cementos y Concretos Moctezuma opened its first plant, located in Jiutepec, in 1943.

Civac (Ciudad Industrial de la Valle de Cuernavaca; Industrial City of the Cuernavaca Valley) was established in 1964. This is the largest and most important industrial park in the state with 120 factories and plants, concentrated in automotive, manufacturing, food, and chemical-pharmaceuticals. Civac also has a residential area.

There are 2,500 commercial establishments in the municipality. Agriculture remains important, and there are many nurseries. Flowers are grown commercially and exported; Jiutepec is the largest grower of Poinsettias in the country. There are 60 ceramic shops in the municipality.

88,923 individuals over the age of 12 are economically active, and there are 8,577 economic units (3rd in the state). 48% of these are in involved in commerce, 40% in service, 11% manufacturing (937 units, 18,560 people), and 1% other.

== Education ==
ceieg Diagnostic Municipal 2015 pp 32-34, retrieved Dec 11, 2018

- Initial Education. 36 schools, 551 students
- Preschool (K1, K2, K3) 125 schools, 486 teachers, 7,414 students
- Elementary School (Primaria, grades 1-6). 116 schools, 1,169 teachers, 22,163 students
- Middle School (Secundaria, grades 7-9). 45 schools, 747 teachers, 11,853 students
- High School (Preparatoria or Bachellarto, grades 10-12). 4 public schools (morning and afternoon) and 7 private schools.

=== Universities ===
- Universidad Continental Justo Sierra (UNICON), Centro
- Centro Educativo de Humanidades (CEDHUM), Colonia José G. Parres
- Universidad Fray Luca Paccioli, Campus Azteca Tejalpa
- Centro Universitario Aztlan, Colonia Apatlaco
- La Universidad Politécnica del Estado de Morelos

== See also ==
- List of people from Morelos
