= Monasteries on the slopes of Popocatépetl =

Earliest monasteries on the slopes of Popocatépetl
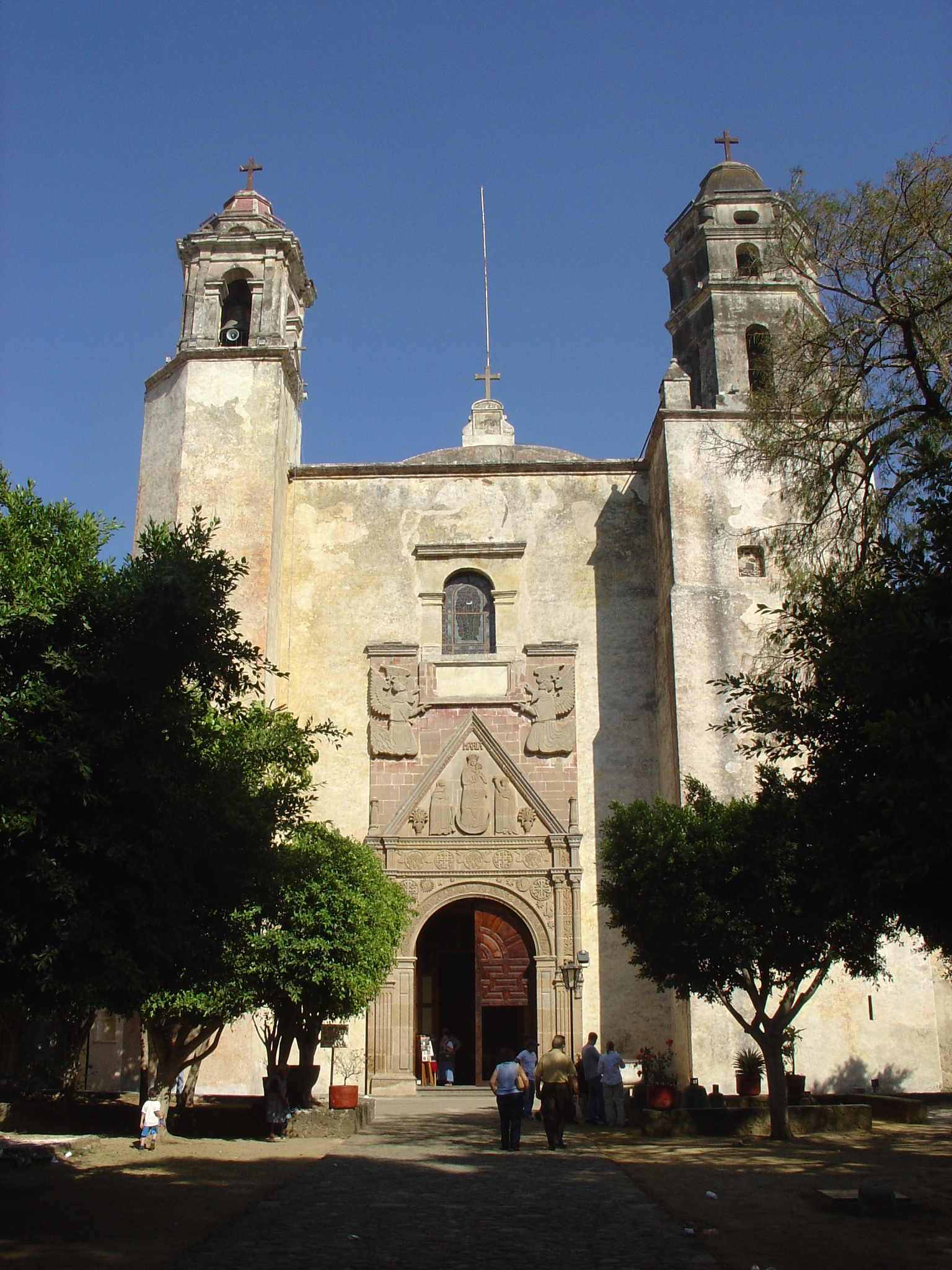
- View of the church façade of the monastery in Tepoztlán
- Interactive map of Earliest monasteries on the slopes of Popocatépetl
- Location: Areas south and east of Popocatépetl, Mexico
- Built: 16th Century
- Built for: The Augustinians, the Franciscans and the Dominicans

UNESCO World Heritage Site
- Type: Cultural
- Criteria: ii, iv
- Designated: 1994 (18th session)
- Reference no.: 702
- Region: Latin America and the Caribbean

The Earliest Monasteries on the Slopes of Popocatepetl (Spanish: Primeros Monasterios en las faldas del Popocatépetl) are sixteen early 16th-century monasteries which were built by the Augustinians, the Franciscans and the Dominicans in order to evangelize the areas south and east of the Popocatépetl volcano in central Mexico. These monasteries were recognized by the UNESCO as World Heritage Sites in 1994, because they served as the model for the early monastery and church buildings as well as evangelization efforts in New Spain and some points beyond in Latin America. These monasteries almost uniformly feature a very large atrium in front of a single nave church with a capilla abierta or open chapel. The atrium functioned as the meeting point between the indigenous peoples and the missionary friars, with mass for the newly converted held outdoors instead of within the church. This arrangement can be found repeated in other areas of Mexico as these friars continued to branch out over New Spain.

The sixteen monasteries are open to visitors, with eleven located in northern Morelos, three in the state of Puebla, and one in Tlaxcala. The twelve in Morelos are also promoted as the "Route of the Volcano" or the "Route of the Monasteries" for tourism purposes. At the 44th session in 2021, the Heritage Site was expanded with the addition of the Cathedral of Tlaxcala.

== Region ==
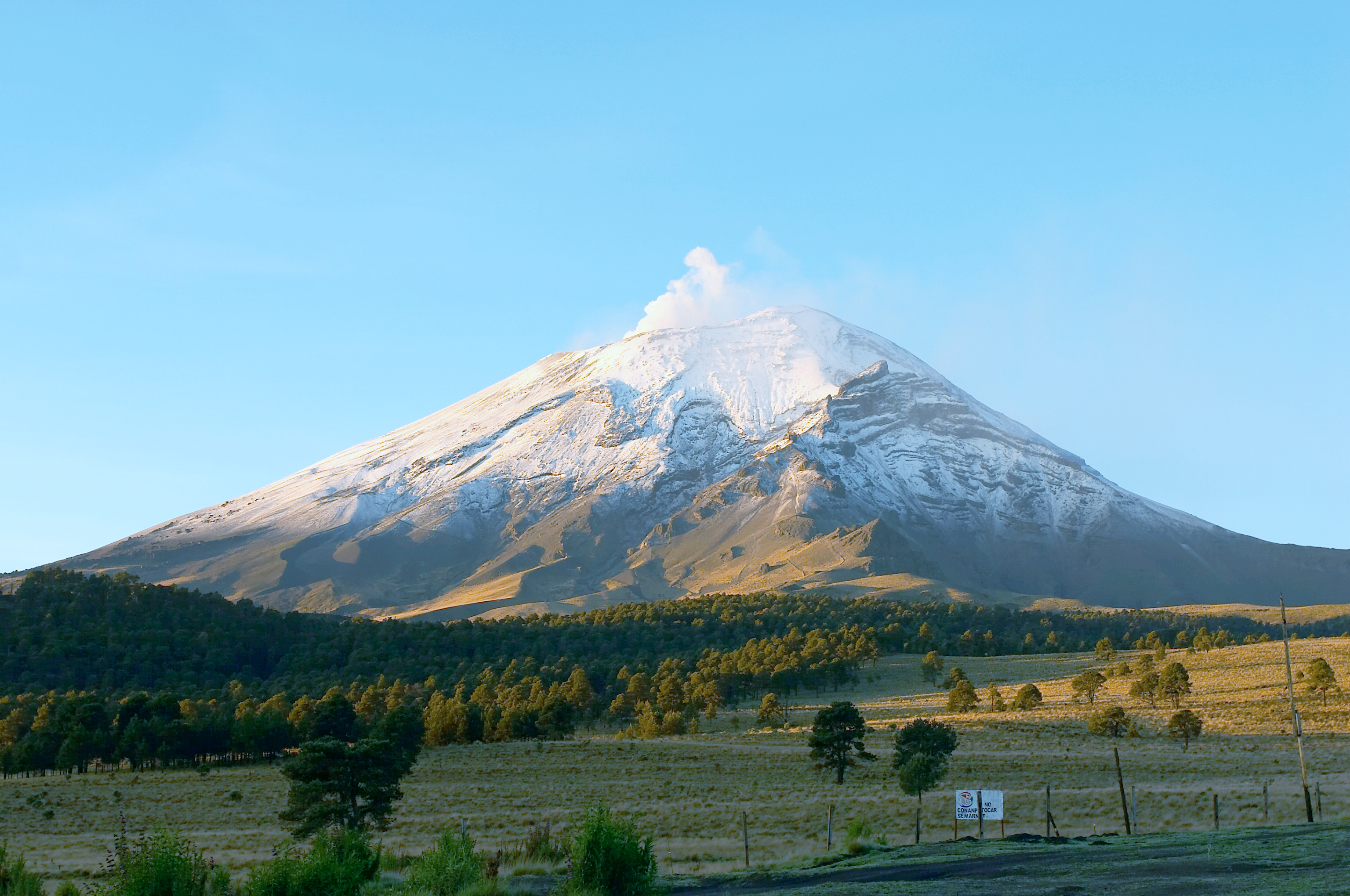
The Popocatépetl volcano seen from the Paso de Cortés.

The World Heritage Site consists of sixteen monasteries that are located south and east of Mexico City, the majority in the state of Morelos, except three that are in the state of Puebla. The monasteries in Morelos are located in the municipalities of Atlatlahucan, Cuernavaca, Tetela del Volcán, Yautepec, Ocuituco, Tepoztlán, Tlayacapan, Totolapan, Yecapixtla and Zacualpan de Amilpas. The three in Puebla are located in Calpan, Huejotzingo and Tochimilco. Most of these monasteries are located on the foothills of the Popocatépetl volcano.

Although Popocatépetl is an active volcano, none of the monasteries have been affected by this activity, although some have been damaged by seismic activity. The danger of the volcano is low in these monasteries and in the more than one hundred historical monuments of the region, because in this area there are low lava flows from the volcano and because the monuments were not built in areas where lava tends to run.

== World Heritage Site ==
The UNESCO World Heritage Site consists of sixteen monasteries that are located south and east of Mexico City, most in the state of Morelos, with three in the state of Puebla, and one in Tlaxcala. The monasteries in Morelos are located in the municipalities of Atlatlahucan, Cuernavaca, Tetela del Volcán (including the one in Hueyapan), Yautepec, Ocuituco, Tepoztlán, Tlayacapan, Totolapan, Yecapixtla and Zacualpan de Amilpas. The three in Puebla are located in Calpan, Huejotzingo and Tochimilco. Most, but not all, of these monasteries are located on the periphery of the Popocatépetl volcano.

They were declared a World Heritage Site on 17 December 1994, due to being the model for monasteries and evangelism on the American Continent. They represent the adoption of an architectural style by the first Franciscan, Dominican and Augustinian missionaries, which included the use of open outdoor space. This use of open space in the planning of churches and monasteries was adopted through most of Mexico and in some other parts of Latin America. There is disagreement as to whether the monasteries represent a complete imposition of European design or whether they adopted certain aspects of indigenous ceremonial spaces. However, the use of open chapels and “capillas posas” or atrium corner chapels, in large atriums were a way of accommodating the first indigenous converts, who were not used to entering large enclosed structures. The atrium became essential as the meeting point between the evangelists and the indigenous.

The sixteen were built at the very beginning of the evangelization period after the Conquest. The monasteries in Morelos are San Mateo Apostol in Atlatlahucan, Asunción in Cuernavaca (current Cathedral), Santo Domingo de Guzmán in Hueyapan, Santiago Apostol in Ocuituco, Santo Domingo in Oaxtepec, La Natividad or la Anunciaciòn in Tepoztlàn, Santo Domingo de Guzman in Tetela del Volcàn, San Juan Bautista in Tlayacapan, San Guillermo Abad in Totolapan, San Juan Bautista in Yecapixtla and Immaculada Concepción in Zacualpan de Amilpas.

In Puebla, there are three: San Francisco de Asís in San Andrés Calpan, San Miguel Arcángel in Huejotzingo and Asunción de Nuestra Señora in Tochimilco.

After the sites' being named as a World Heritage Site, the Instituto Nacional de Antropología e Historia, (INAH) pledged millions of pesos for the restoration and preservation of eleven of the monastery sites. Much of the money was targeted to problems caused by humidity in the walls. One of the first projects was to restore the mural work in the Tetela del Volcán monastery. Another early project was to restore the gardens and fields of the Atlatlahucan monastery. These fields now produce avocados and other crops which are sold to help fund maintenance.

Over 70% of the monasteries built in the 16th century are still in good condition. However, there are claims that the money allocated for the restoration work is insufficient for the job and far less than has been budgeted for other landmarks such as the Basilica of Guadalupe or even the Palace of the Marqués del Apartado. Much of the work that has been done involves restoring the atrium areas, processional corridors and the atrium chapels, where they still exist. Another major effort is to rid the buildings of moss and plants growing on the buildings themselves. Restoration work in a number of the monasteries and restored, and in some cases, led to the rediscovery of murals. However, much restoration work still needs to be done.

Despite Popocatepetl's being an active volcano, none of the monasteries have been damaged by it, although some have been damaged by earthquake activity. Volcano danger to these and the over 100 other historical monuments in the area is low because lava flows from the volcano are generally slow and monuments were not built in the low-lying areas that lava tends to run to.

To further publicize the World Heritage monasteries in Morelos, the state promotes the eleven as the Route of the monasteries or the Route of the Volcano. The route begins in Cuernavaca with the monastery church serving as the city's cathedral. The route then moves east and somewhat north through Tepoztlán, Oaxtepec, Tlayacapan, Totolapan, Atlatlahuacan, Yecapixtla, Ocuituco, Tetela del Volcán and Hueyapan before ending in Zacualpan de Amilpas.

== Monasteries ==
The sixteen 16th-century monasteries listed by UNESCO as World Heritage Sites located around the foothills of the Popocatépetl Volcano are:

| Code (Note: Code used by UNESCO to define and classify the World Heritage Site.) | Image | Name | Town | State | Coordinates | Protected area |
|---|---|---|---|---|---|---|
| 702–001 | | Convent of San Mateo Apóstol y Evangelista | Atlatlahucan | Morelos | 18°56′5″N 98°53′52″W | Property: 1.23 ha. Buffer zone: 0.13 ha. |
| 702–002 | | Cuernavaca Cathedral | Cuernavaca | Morelos | 18°52′2″N 99°14′42″W | Property: 1.57 ha. Buffer zone: 1.43 ha. |
| 702–003 | | Convent of Santo Domingo de Guzmán, Hueyapan | Hueyapan | Morelos | 18°53′10″N 98°41′25″W | Property: 0.91 ha. Buffer zone: 0.5 ha. |
| 702–004 | | Convent of Santo Domingo de Guzmán, Oaxtepec | Oaxtepec | Morelos | 18°54′25″N 98°58′15″W | Property: 0.99 ha. Buffer zone: 1.14 ha. |
| 702–005 | | Augustinian Convent and Church of Santiago Apóstol | Ocuituco | Morelos | 18°52′37″N 98°46′32″W | Property: 0.62 ha. Buffer zone: 1.28 ha. |
| 702–006 | | Convent of la Natividad or de la Anunciación | Tepoztlán | Morelos | 18°59′10″N 99°5′7″W | Property: 1.42 ha. Buffer zone: 1.31 ha. |
| 702–007 | | Convent of San Juan Bautista | Tetela del Volcán | Morelos | 18°53′31″N 98°43′46″W | Property: 1.19 ha. Buffer zone: 2.89 ha. |
| 702–008 | | Convent of San Juan Bautista | Tlayacapan | Morelos | 18°57′20″N 98°58′52″W | Property: 0.62 ha. Buffer zone: 1.36 ha. |
| 702–009 | | Convent of San Guillermo | Totolapan | Morelos | 18°59′24″N 98°55′6″W | Property: 3.61 ha. Buffer zone: 1.23 ha. |
| 702–010 | | Dominican Convent and Church la Asunción de María | Yautepec | Morelos | | |
| 702–011 | | Convent of San Juan Bautista | Yecapixtla | Morelos | 18°53′3″N 98°51′47″W | Property: 1.2 ha. Buffer zone: 3.13 ha. |
| 702–012 | | Convent of la Inmaculada Concepción | Zacualpan de Amilpas | Morelos | 18°47′11″N 98°46′5″W | Property: 1.94 ha. Buffer zone: 0.24 ha. |
| 702–013 | | Convent of San Francisco de Asís | Calpan | Puebla | 19°6′0″N 98°27′54″W | Property: 1.51 ha. Buffer zone: 0.75 ha. |
| 702–014 | | Convent of San Miguel Arcángel | Huejotzingo | Puebla | 19°9′27″N 98°24′13″W | Property: 5.65 ha. Buffer zone: 1.29 ha. |
| 702–015 | | Convent of la Asunción de Nuestra Señora | Tochimilco | Puebla | 18°53′28″N 98°34′21″W | Property: 1.1 ha. Buffer zone: 2.4 ha. |
| 702–016 | | Franciscan Ensemble of the Monastery and Cathedral of Our Lady of the Assumption of Tlaxcala | Tlaxcala de Xicohténcatl | Tlaxcala | 19°18′50.34″N 98°14′15.57″W | Property: 2.82 ha. |

== Common elements ==
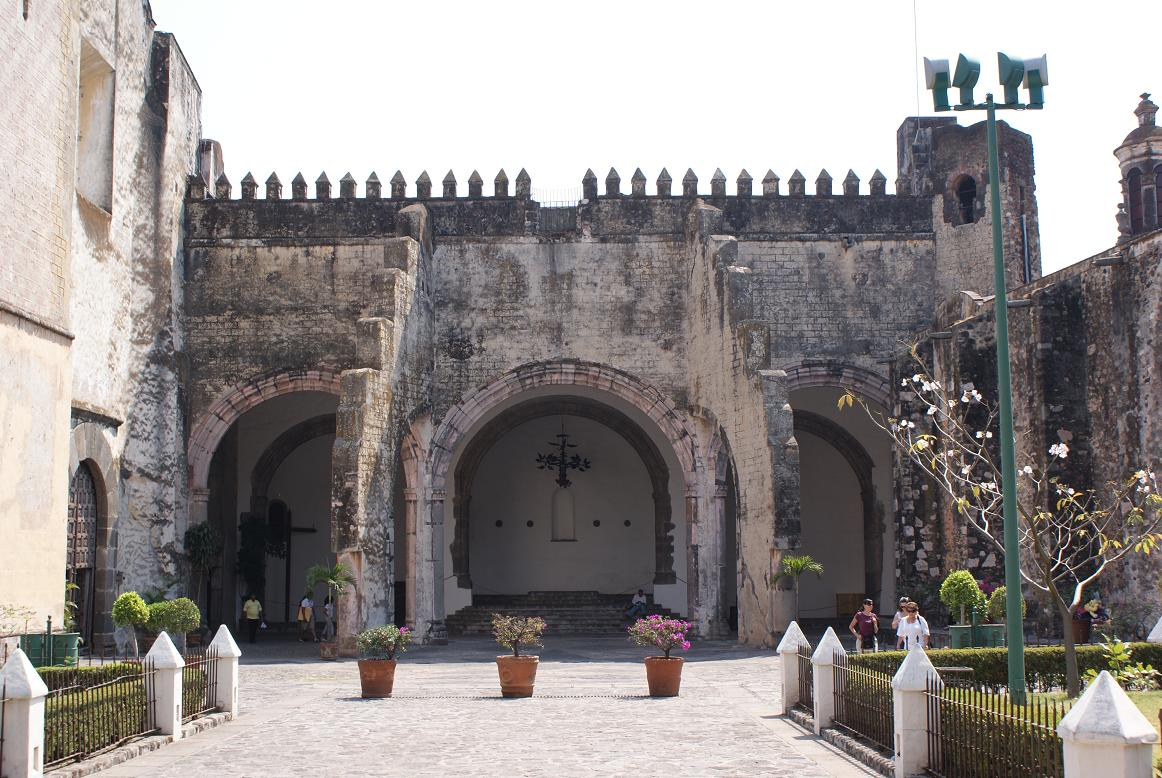
The capilla abierta of the Cathedral of the Assumption in Cuernavaca

The reason for being a World Heritage site is that the construction of these monasteries served as an architectural and urban planning model for the monasteries and towns that followed. These monasteries were built to be very solid with thick walls and had a very austere aspect. In some of the complexes, one can see stone merlons which make the complexes look like castles or forts. These were for defensive purposes, as the monks were invading Mesoamerican lands to impose a new religion. For this reason, churches and monasteries of this type are called “fortress temples.”

Most of the monasteries have a large atrium in front of the church, an open chapel, four chapels in each corner of the atrium, and atrium cross, Stations of the cross on the atrium walls, a roofed church, and the cloister area for the monks. Unlike churches built before and in the centuries after, the atrium played a critical role in these monasteries, built initially for the purpose of evangelization. Each monastery had only a handful of monks but hundreds of indigenous converts to whom to say Mass. Part of the reason was to accommodate the large numbers but also because pre-Hispanic rites were performed outside. For evangelization, the atrium and its accompanying open chapel were built first. The atriums are surrounded by low walls, none over five meters high, to give a more intimate feel but keeping the area outside. The open chapels were almost always built on the side of the main church and facing the same direction, towards the atrium. Since most indigenous peoples could not read or write, the churches and open chapels were painted with Biblical scenes in order to evangelize through the images. The atrium walls often have markings for the Stations of the Cross and four chapels, one in each corner. These are called capillas posas. They were used during processions, especially during Corpus Christi, holding the Host. In the middle of the atrium, a large stone cross was placed. On the outside of these early churches, crosses almost always appear without the figure of Christ. The reason for this is that the friars did not want the natives to link the old practice of human sacrifice to the new religion and thus use it as justification for the continuation of the practice.

The large-roofed churches have only one name and on one side, usually on the south, is the cloister area for the monks. Most of the cloisters have or had murals, large gardens and fountains. Decorative elements in both vary, often mixing different trends that were prevalent in Europe at the time, such as rose windows common on French cathedrals, portals similar to those in Spain and even Islamic style triangular altars. A number of hidden elements such as certain numbers important to native beliefs can be found in the churches, such as the number of stairs and aspects of the decorative figures. It is unknown whether these were tolerated by the friars or whether they were added clandestinely.

== History ==
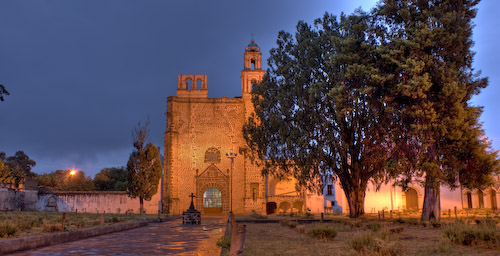
View of the complex at Tochimilco

The monasteries are part of the history of the early evangelization of Mexico. The Franciscans were invited to come first by Hernán Cortés, followed shortly thereafter by the Dominicans and the Augustinians. After establishing themselves in Mexico City and in the rest of the Valley of Mexico, they evangelized the area south and east of the volcano. The missionaries included Juan de Tecto, Juan de Ayora and Pedro de Gante, the last of whom learned Nahuatl in order to communicate with the indigenous peoples. The first of the monasteries were built by the Franciscans in 1524, who founded the monasteries of Huejotzingo, Cuernavaca, Calpan and Tochimilco. The Dominicans followed in 1526, founding those in Oaxtepec, Tepoztlan, Tetela del Volcán and Hueyapan. The Augustinians arrived in 1533 and founded the monasteries in Ocuituco, Totolapan, Yecapixtla, Tlayacapan, Atlatlauhcan and Zacualpan de Amilpas. Later, these same monasteries would send missionaries to other parts of New Spain, such as Guerrero, Oaxaca, Chiapas and Guatemala.

The monasteries served as the cornerstones for the towns founded and refounded by the Spanish during the very early colonial period, with the rest of the indigenous population settled or resettled around it. The monasteries also served as early hospitals, schools and storage facilities for food and water, with aqueducts often leading to them. The Augustinians not only evangelized: they established the first centers of schooling in European studies for the indigenous. The Dominicans gave greater priority to economic development of the areas they evangelized, taking advantage of the fertility of the land. They were more prominent in the higher altitudes.

Some, such as the one in Tlayacapan, were used as barracks during the Mexican Revolution and soldiers’ graffiti from that time has been found. Others such as Yecapixtla also contain recent graffiti, due to the lack of vigilance.

== The individual monasteries ==
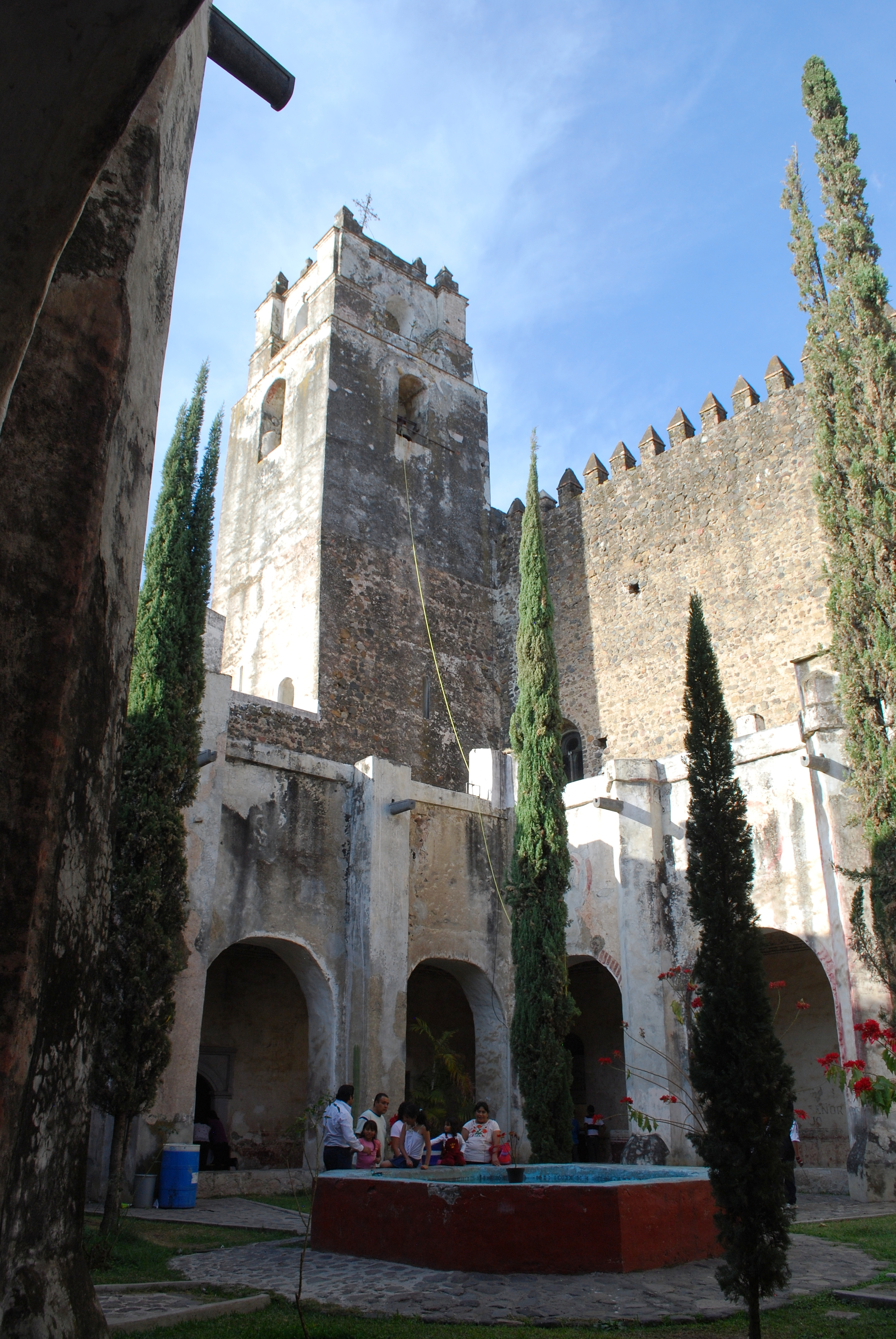
View of the cloister and bell tower of the monastery in Yecapixtla

The monastery of La Asunción in Cuernavaca is better known as the city's Cathedral. It was founded by the Franciscans, and originally permitted only indigenous nobles to enter its grounds along with the Spanish. It was the fifth construction in New Spain ordered and supervised by Toribio de Benavente Motolinia. The only one of the fourteen monasteries that were originally inscribed to have suffered significant changes over its history, the cathedral has been modified several times. Because of the importance of the city and the church's role as an ecclesiastical seat, the church and grounds were modified. The large open chapel was reconditioned as a portal and the atrium chapels were enlarged into churches of significant size. The last round of major renovations and changes, which included the restoration of its murals by specialists and the addition of modern elements, especially in the main altar area, occurred in the late 1970s and early 1980s. The cloister retains a number of frescos, some of which depict New Spain missionaries in the Philippines and Japan. The open chapel is frequently used for weddings.

Located on a hill in the Tepozteco Valley, the monastery of La Natividad de Nuestra Señora in Tepotzlán was built between 1550 and 1564 and still towers over the other buildings in the town. It initially began with only five Dominican friars. The large atrium has a large stone cross with symbols of the Passion. There is an open chapel and chapels in the capillas posas in the corners, but most of these are in ruins. The cloister contains friezes with the coat of arms of the order. There is evidence of syncretism of indigenous and Catholic beliefs such as the image of an angel with European facial features but with eagle's wings, similar to those which can be found on Quetzalcoatl. In the interior, there is a fresco with a xoloitzcuintle dog with a torch in its mouth and a border around the walls with squash flowers and roses, surrounded with precious stones, including a native one called “chalchihuite.” The plaza in front of the atrium of the monastery in Tepoztlán is crowded with a tianguis market which sells everything from basic food staples to New Age paraphernalia.

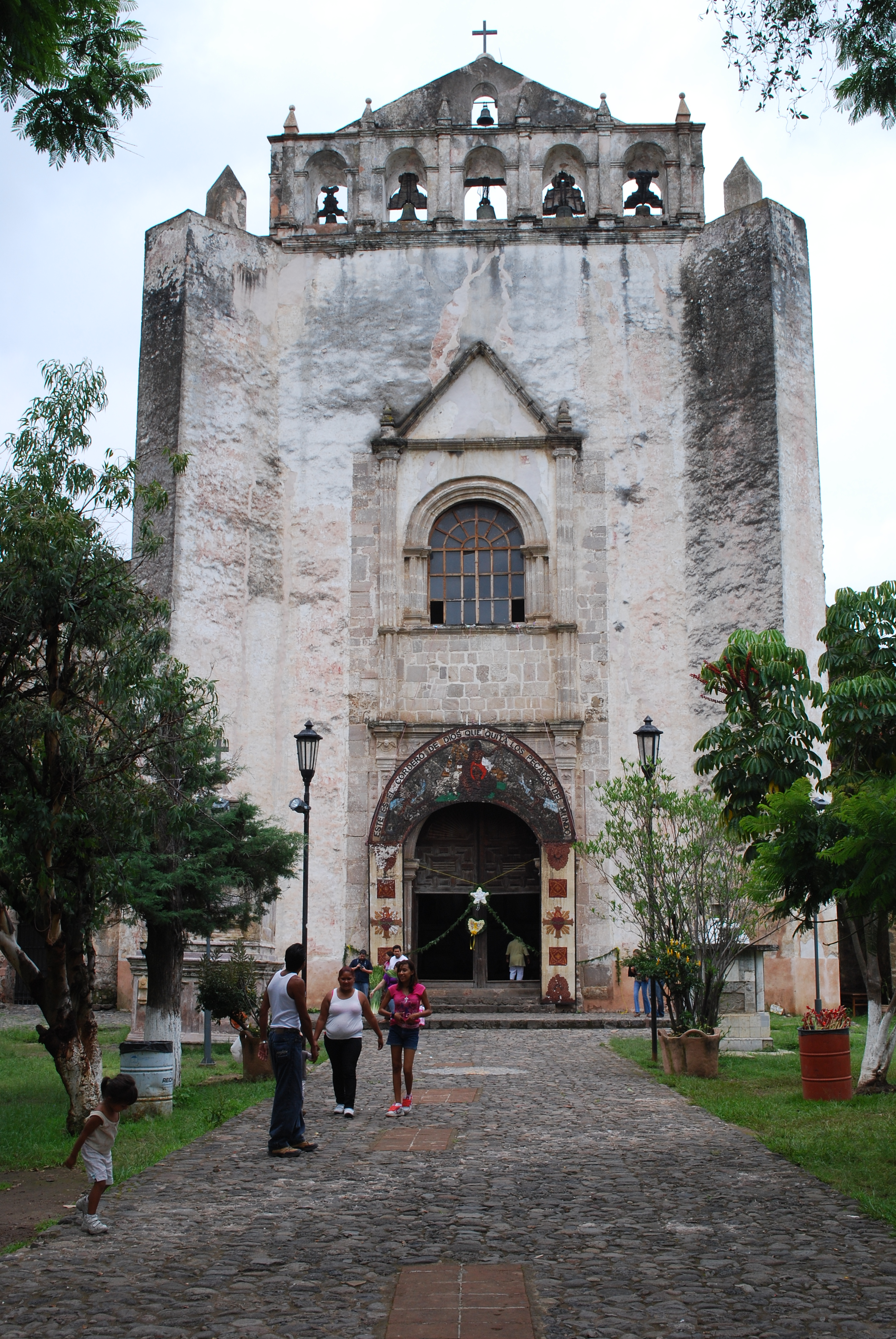
Facade of the monastery church in Tlayacapán

The monastery of Tlayacapán was constructed between 1554 and 1572 by the Augustinians and contains one of the largest churches in Morelos state. It is mostly Renaissance style but it also has Gothic aspects. Syncretism can be found here as well with the incorporation of suns and moons in the decoration of the church's façade. The open chapel and cloister area has been converted into a museum which is administered by a local civil association. Here are found the best preserved of the complex's mostly black-and-white mural work, pre-Hispanic and colonial pieces and well as some mummified remains from the 18th century. The preserved murals cover over 2,700m2 and depict figures and scenes such as the Dream of Saint Joseph, Catherine of Siena and the Presentation of Christ at the Temple.

The monastery of San Guillermo Abad is located in Totolapán and built by the Augustinians in 1553. Its cloister is small even though its walls and buttresses are very heavy. The corner chapels in the atrium are still intact and there are a number of notable oil paintings and an old organ in the choir of the church. There is also an outstanding two-color frieze in one of the rooms on the first floor of the cloister near the main façade of the church. This and other mural work in the inner passageways of the cloister have been recently restored. Stone arcades and pillars are decorated with small stones set with cement.

The Dominican monastery of Santo Domingo in Oaxtepec is located on a fairly steep hill over a pre-Hispanic ceremonial platform. For this reason, the atrium is not located in front of the church and is more elevated than the church. In the interior of the church, Gothic arches support the roof and the vault is decorated with floral motifs. There are two wood altarpieces from the 17th century. The monastery of Oaxtepec has pillars in the cloister with images of saints, and barrel vaults decorated with repeating motifs such as fleur-de-lis. The murals here have remnants of blue coloring, which is unusual but most have lost their color entirely. Most of the murals which have disappeared completely have been destroyed by humidity, which is mostly due to the lack of maintenance of the roof's drainage. The monastery's cloister has been converted into a museum, but only three of the halls are open to the public. It contains a modest collection of pre-Hispanic pieces and regional animals, insects and plants.

The monastery of San Mateo Apostol in Atlatlahuacán was built by the Augustinians around 1570 over the remains of a pre-Hispanic temple in the highest part of the town. The Stations of the Cross in the atrium are represented by small chapels on the exterior of the atrium wall. It has two roofed chapels in its atrium, one of which has a mural of the genealogical tree of Saint Augustine. The façade of the church is exceedingly tall, common in Augustinian constructions, extending about 50 meters in height. Fresco paintings covered most of the interior of the complex, with vaults that combine Moorish elements with those of the Italian Renaissance. Confession booths were constructed in an “s” pattern in the wall dividing the church from the cloister area. In the cloister, one of the principal attractions is one vault on the ground floor, decorated with a chain made with images of the Sacred Heart of Jesus. The upper level serves as the home of the parish priest.

The monastery of Santiago Apostol in Ocuituco dates from 1534 and is the first Augustinian monastery on the American mainland, with Fray Juan de Zumárraga celebrating its first mass in 1534. It served as not only an evangelization center, but also a training center for monks. The monastery has a vault in the lower floor of the cloister which used browns, whites and greens in its figures. The chapel for pilgrims is closed, unlike the other monasteries, but the rest of the complex is open to visitors. There have been some modifications to the buildings since they were built, but one well-preserved element is its 16th-century stone fountain, the oldest of all the monasteries of the World Heritage Site. This fountain is a replica of one found in the Alhambra in Córdoba. It features six sandstone lions facing the center, which were sculpted by indigenous craftsmen. Located on the outside of the cloister, there is another fountain that used to be known as the Fountain of the Mermaids (Fuente de las Sirenas), but it has badly deteriorated. Both provided the community with water which flowed to them from Popocatepetl.

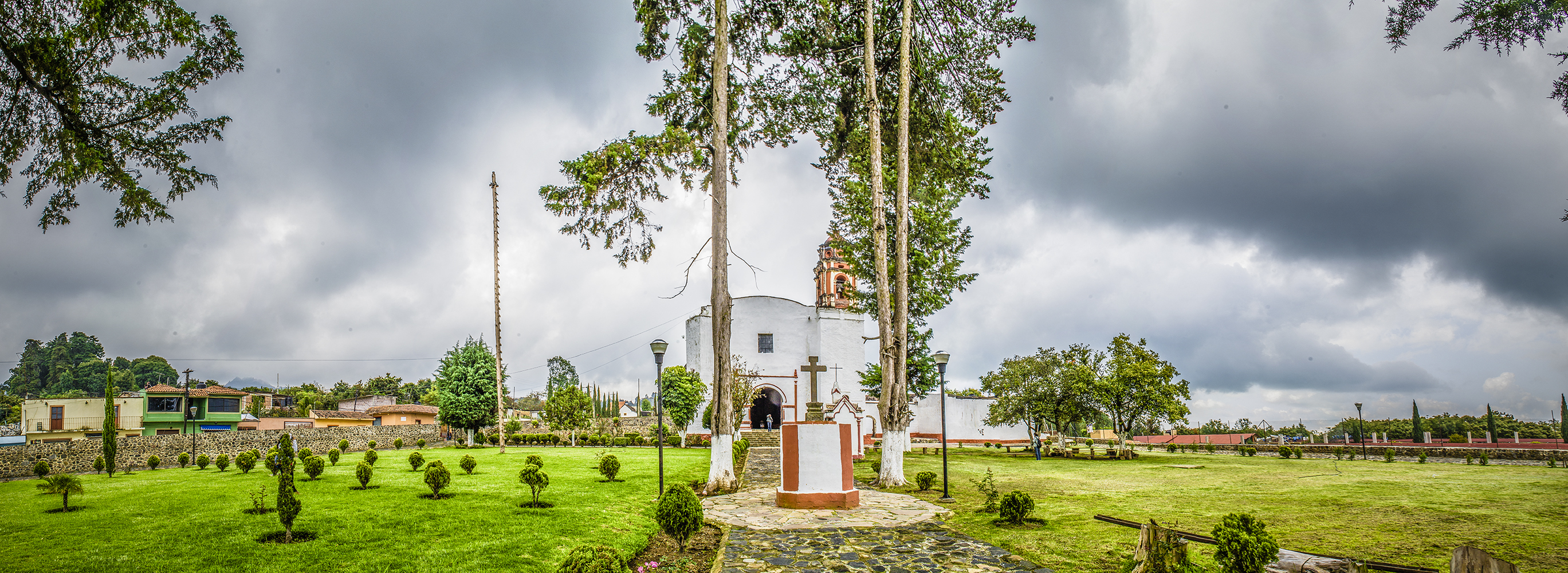
The patio and façade of the ex-convent of Santo Domingo de Guzmán in Hueyapan

The monastery of Santo Domingo de guzmán in Hueyapán has the highest altitude of the monasteries in the state of Morelos, with its climate cold compared to most of the rest of the state. It is one of the monasteries closest to the volcano. It was founded by the Dominicans, but its cloister was built of adobe and wood with a tile roof instead of stone. It disintegrated relatively quickly due to the elements and was abandoned. It remains mostly closed to this day. Only the atrium area is open to visitors and this closes by 1pm each day. The austere façade of the main church survives and it has a notable Barorque niche. It is also possible to see a number of its remaining murals.

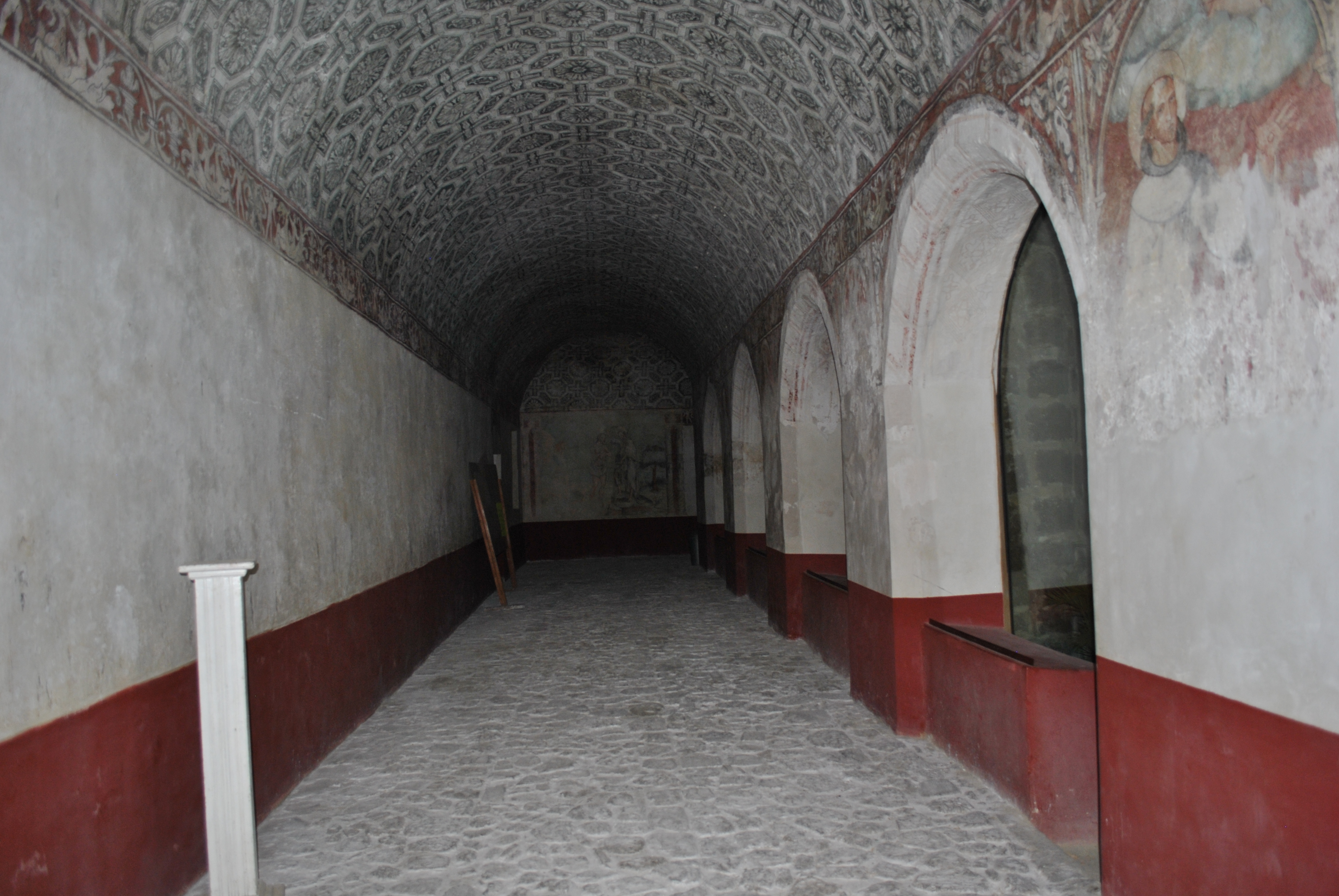
View of the Atrium of the ex-convent with one of the frescos in the foreground.

The monastery of San Juan Bautista in Tetela del Volcán was built by the Dominicans in the first half of the 16th century and was even visited by Hernán Cortés. It is at a high altitude near the volcano surrounded by pine forest in a relatively cold climate. The exterior has arcades that surround the complex but are partially hidden by trees. The upper parts of the walls around the complex are covered in paint; the lower floor of the cloister has figures depicted in the arches and walls. Many are of Augustinian monks. In the vaults over the walkways, there are numerous cherubs which are defeating evil spirits and some are even fighting with each other. One unique architectural element is the Moorish-style wood-beam roofing in the sacristy. There is a crafts market held here each Wednesday. The atrium have a series of frescos of very high quality, painted by a local indigenous artist in the 16th century. They were restored in 2008.

The Augustinian monastery of San Juan Bautista in Yecapixtla was planned by Jorge de Ávila and Jeronimo de San Esteban, based on the plans for the Metropolitan Cathedral in Mexico City. There is an atrium wall with 365 triangular sculptures which are similar to those in teocallis as well as merlons. The atrium area conserves its corner chapels and its center stone cross. The façade of the church is considered to be one of the purest examples of Renaissance architecture in New Spain, but it does features a Gothic style rose window. The cloister is large and well-lit, but it has only one floor in the back; normally cloisters have two floors all the way around. The front of the cloister does have two floors. In the portal for pilgrims, there is an image of the Virgin Mary surrounded by cherubs. This image has a blue background, a color rarely used in the decoration of churches and monasteries of this time. The vault on the lower floor of the cloister is at least 10 meters high off the floor and has remnants of mural painting such as Stations of the Cross and some of the daily life of Augustinian friars. It contains a fountain from the 17th century.

The monastery of La Concepción in Zacualpán was built by the Augustinians. It has conserved much of its original layout, including the original layout of gardens and homes that surround it. Water here is provided by the melting snows of Popocatepetl. The baptistery has an arch and in its wall are the remains of a painted altarpiece. Its Rosario Chapel has other small Baroque altarpieces of great quality. There is a stone baptismal font made by indigenous hands and a series of chapels in the atrium which date to the 18th century. There is also a series of artworks from the same time period.

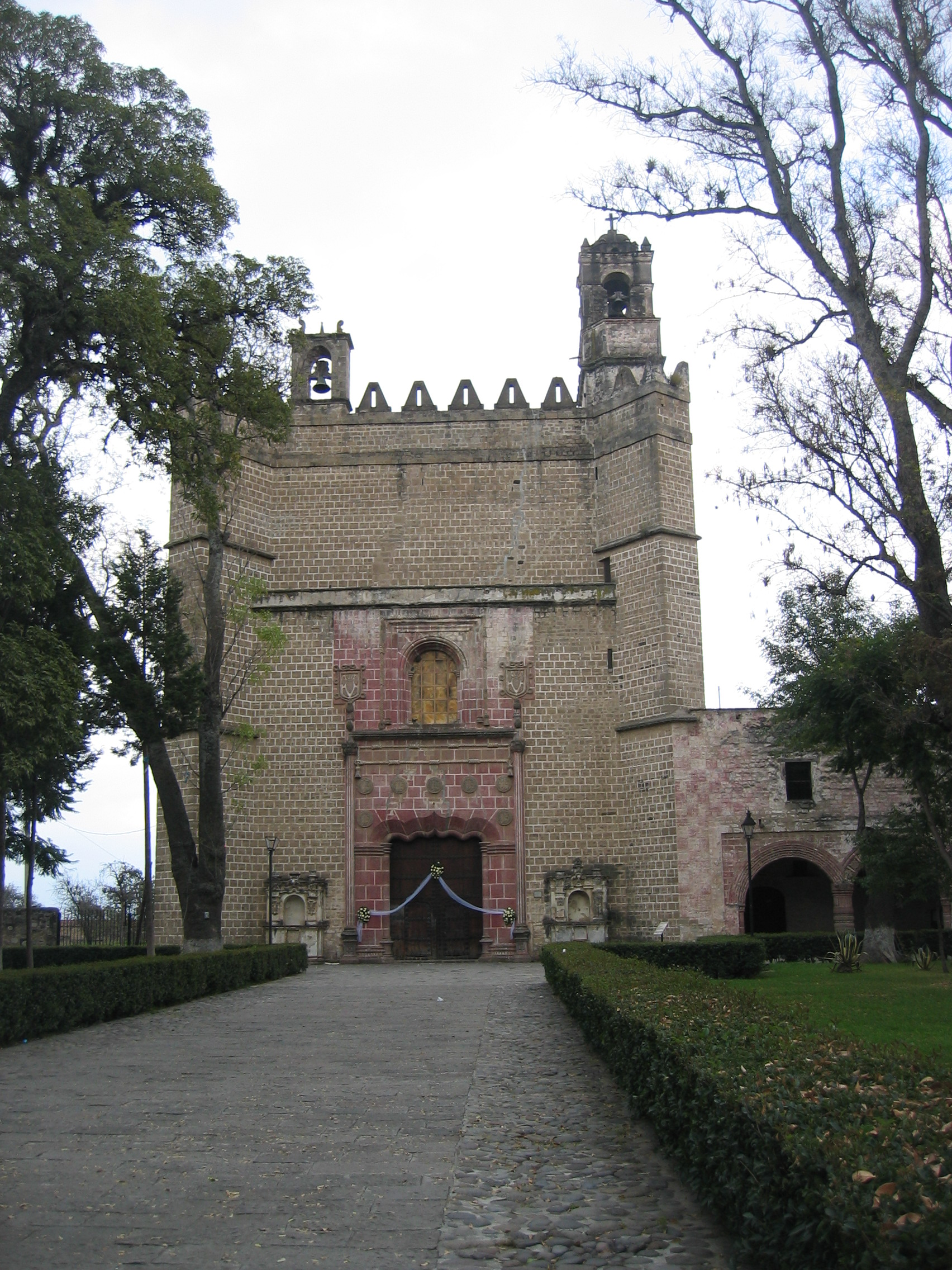
Portal of the convent of Huejotzingo

Huejotzingo is the oldest of the fifteen, constructed in 1524. It is also one of the most impressive for the variety of elements which have been preserved well. The atrium has four corner chapels which are some of the most elaborate of their type from colonial Mexico. There are finely crafted from sandstone. The main altarpiece is from the 16th century with only three in Mexico as old as it. The atrium cross has a detailed crown of thorns. The remains of the aqueduct can be found on one of the atrium walls.

Calpan was subdued by Cortés personally in 1522 and the Franciscans arrived here to build the San Andrés Apostol monastery complex in 1548 under Juan de Alameda. The capillas posas were begun in 1555. The façade is Plateresque with Moorish influence. It is adorned with Isabelina volutes on the entrance arch with shells on top. There is one bell tower on the right-hand side. Its single nave is wide, with a choir which was initially reserved for the friars so that they would not be seen by the general populace. The cloister is now a site museum, with its entrance through the open chapel.

The chapels, built of pink sandstone in the corners of the atrium, are noted for their finely sculpted reliefs. The first chapel is located on the side of the cloister and dedicated to the Virgin Mary. It contains murals with relief about the life and suffering of Mary. The second is on the left of the first and dedicated to Saint Francis of Assisi with similar depictions about this saint. The third is dedicated to the Archangel Michael and the last to John the Baptist, following the pattern of the first two. These make these chapels unique in Mexico and are the reason this monastery was included.

The Asunción de Nuestra Señora monastery in Tochimilco receives water from the volcano via a long aqueduct which brings the liquid directly into the building as well as to a 16th-century fountain in the plaza of the town. The inner walls of the atrium have niches for each of the Stations of the Cross. This monastery was affected by an earthquake in 1999, damaging walls and vaults, but this damage has since been repaired during restoration work which was carried out between 2001 and 2003.(cartografia) The monastery hosts temporary exhibits such as the Cartografía Novohispana de Tochimilco, sponsored by the INAH, with maps on loan from the Archivo de Indias in Seville, Spain.
