= Felipa Hernández Barragán =

- Born: 1910; Tlayacapan, Morelos, Mexico
- Died: 2011 (aged 100–101)
- Occupation: Artist

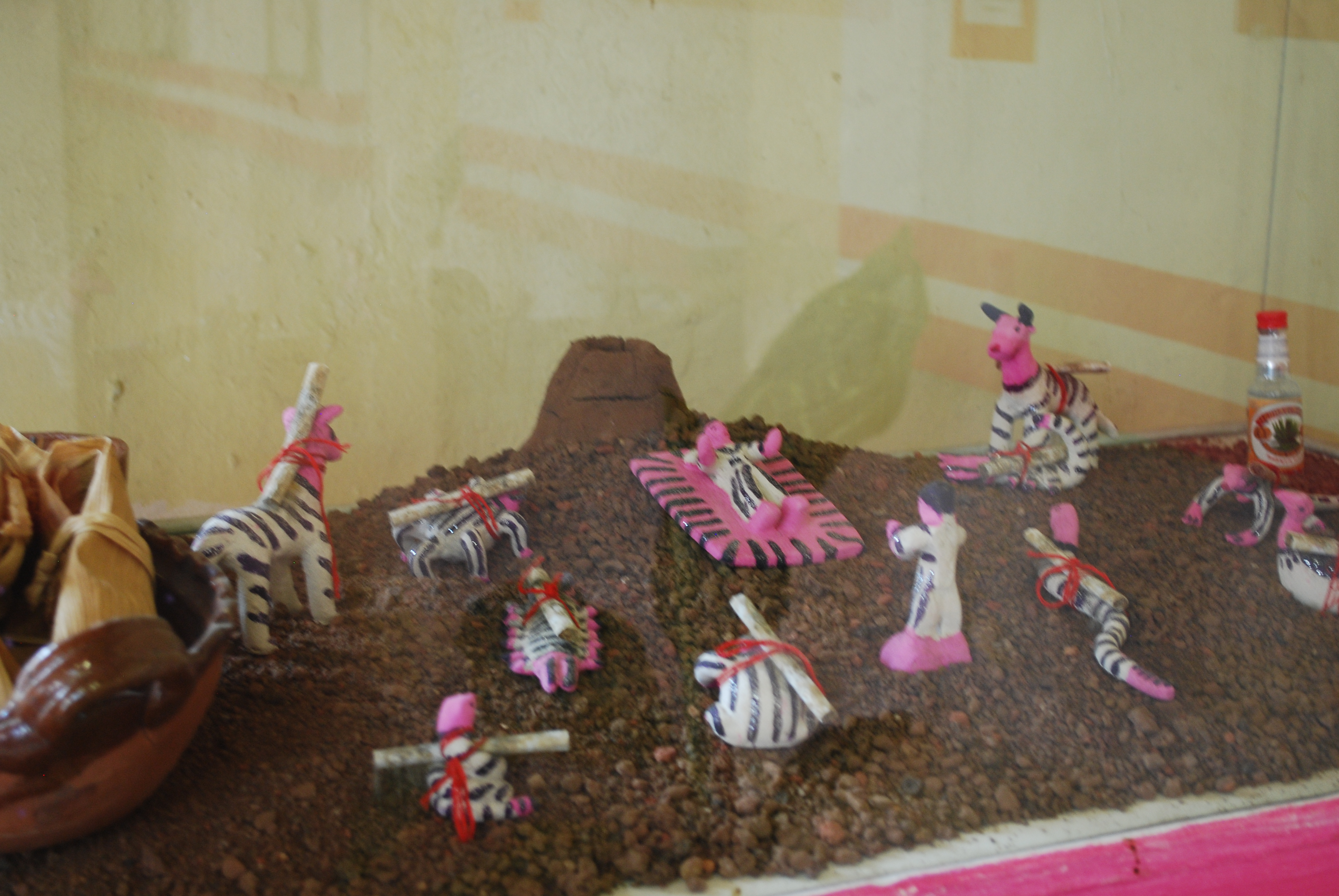
”Juego de Aire” by the artisan

Felipa Hernández Barragán (1910–2011) is a Mexican potter known for the making of a set of figures used in the curing of ailments caused by "bad air".

== Biography ==
Hernández Barragán was born and raised in Tlayacapan, a small town in the state of Morelos, Mexico, south of Mexico City. This town is located in a box canyon, surrounded by the Chichinautzin mountains. This affects wind and rain patterns, which in turn have affected local beliefs. Felipa began working in clay in 1931, working under her mother, Virginia Cervantes, who was a healer. Although records do not exist, family lore indicates that this vocations was in the family for generations prior along the female line. Although Hernández Barragán did not become a healer, she showed skill in pottery, making not only the sets for which she is noted, but also traditional glazed utilitarian wares as well. These sets are called “juegos del aire” (lit. air sets) used to cures “males de aire” (lit. air sicknesses). Hernández Barragán continues to make the pieces to order until the mid-2000s leaving only her daughter, María del Refugio Reyes Hernández, left who makes them. Some of Hernández Barragán’s pieces can be found on permanent display at the Tlayacapan community museum, along with a complete description of the ritual.

== Juegos del aire ==
The sets consists of twelve small figures, between five and eight centimeters high, small enough to be fired on a comal, with a pot covering it to make a kind of small oven. There are two kinds of sets, one for children and one for adults. In both, the pieces are painted white, with pink faces, with red lines on the sets for children and black lines on the sets for adults. Both are painted in enamels and the stripes have diamond points. The use of red and black for age is of Mesoamerican origin, relating to the position of the sun. The sets include two human figures, one on a mattress or petate with represents the sick person and another which represents the healer, which has a dove in his/her hands. Another piece is that of a dove, which also serves as a whistle. The other nine pieces are those of animals considered harmful such as a snake, a millipede, a lizard, a tarantula, a spider, a frog, a coyote, a scorpion and a bull. The bull is a later addition, since it was introduced by the Spanish, who in stories often related it to the devil.

The pieces are not simply an offering, but rather each piece has a specific function a healing ceremony. The basic idea behind the healing is that certain afflictions come from “mal aire” or “bad air” that causes imbalance in the patient. This has its origins in Mesoamerican belief, as then wind was considered to have both positive and negative properties. The various animals represents kind of “bad air”, a concepts reinforced by tying small cigarettes to each with a red wire. The goal is to take the air from the patient and have it absorbed into the earth. For this reason, the animal figures are made of clay.

After the cigarettes are tied to the animal figures, each one is passed over the patient as a kind of cleansing, while prayers are said. Then each animal is placed in a basket made of red crepe paper. This part of the ceremony is to remove the bad air from the patient. Then the basket is taken outside to an ants’ nets, with offerings of food such as mole and tamales and candles. The dove whistle is sounded to the four cardinal directions. The goal here is to ground the bad air into the earth, using the ants as agents.
