= Atlatlahucan =

- Town
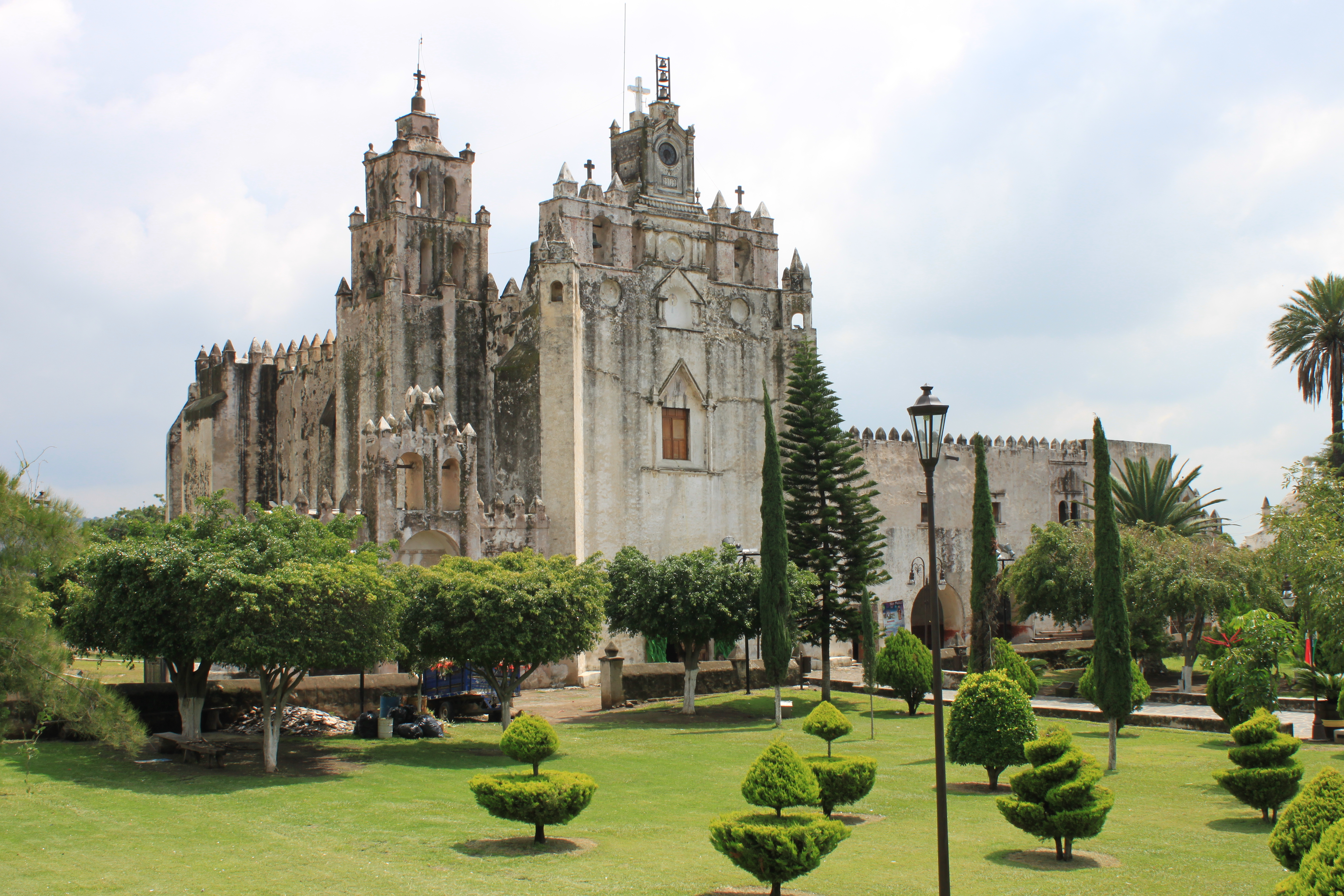
- The monastery of San Mateo Atlatahucan

- Location in Mexico
- Country: Mexico
- State: Morelos

Government
  - President: Alma Delia Reyes Linares
- Elevation: 1,617 m (5,305 ft)

Population (2020)
  - Total: 25,232
- Time zone: UTC-6 (Central Zone)
- Postal code: 62840
- Area code: 735

Atlatlahucan /ˌætləˈtlaʊkæn/ (from the Nahuatl word [at͡ɬaˈt͡ɬaʍkan]) is a city in the Mexican state of Morelos. The name means Place of red or brown water, and today the water is stored in a type of cistern called a jagüey. To the north is the State of Mexico, south is Cuautla, east is Yecapixtla, and west are Tlayacapan and Yautepec. It stands at 18°56′N 98°54′W, at a mean height of 1,656 metres (5,433 ft.) above sea level. The municipality covers 71 km^{2} (27.4 square miles).

The city serves as the municipal seat for the surrounding municipality of the same name. The municipality reported 22,079 inhabitants in the 2015 census. The population of the municipality of Atlatlahucan was 25,232 and the city of Atlatlahucan was 9,018 in 2020.

== History ==
The Xochimilcas extended their conquest to Totolapan and Atlatlahucan in 1436. Moctezuma Ilhuicamina expanded his conquests in the Morelos valley include to Atlatlahucan, which was forced to pay tribute to the Aztec sovereign.

After the Spanish conquest, the town ignored its annexation to the Marquisate of the Valley of Oaxaca. In 1533, Augustinian friars Jerónimo de San Esteban and Jorge de Ávila arrived. They built a parish church that was secularized in 1548. A monastery was founded in 1570, although the actual date may be a bit later because the town was still subject to Totolapan at that time.

Atlatlahucan was an assistant municipality of Tlayacapan, but on December 25, 1932, it became a municipality in its own right. Ignacio Bello was chosen as the first municipal president.

On August 24, 1964, the town was the site of an explosion that killed 37 people and injured 40 others, after a stockpile of fireworks went off prematurely while stored next to two tanks of butane.

Calixto Urbano Lagunas of Juntos Haremos Historia (Together we will make history coalition) was elected Presidente Municipal (municipal president) in the election of July 1, 2018.

The state of Morelos reported 209 cases and 28 deaths due to the COVID-19 pandemic in Mexico, as of April 27, 2020; five cases were reported in Atlatahucan. Schools and many businesses were closed from mid March until June 1. The state office of DIF sent food and water to vulnerable groups of people in eight municipalities including Atlatlahucan on May 26. On June 2, Atlatlahucan reported twelve confirmed cases and two deaths; the reopening of the state was pushed back until at least June 13. Atlatahucan reported 33 cases, 25 recuperations, and five deaths as of August 31. Sixty-one cases were reported on December 27, 2020.

== Tourist Attractions ==
=== Ex-Convento de San Mateo Apóstol ===
The monastery of San Mateo Atlatahucan was founded by Fray Jorge de Avila of the order of the Augustinians (1570?), who also founded the temples and of Tlayacapan, Ocuituco, Yecapixtla, and Totolapan. All these monasteries are part of the UNESCO World Heritage Sites.

The complex is rectangular. There is an open chapel in the northwest corner built with three arches. The façade of the church has an undecorated arched door; above that is a rectangular coral window set in a niche surrounded by small pilasters. Above that, there is a classic clock dating from the latter part of the 19th century. To the rear of the church, there is a bell tower which appears to have been built later than the church, although it is in the same style.

The cloister is simple and austere, without luxury or decorations, in sharp contrast to the public areas of the church, tower, open chapel, and capillas posas used for unbaptized Indigenous.

The feast of St. Matthew the Apostle is September 21.

=== Other attractions ===
Thirteen neighborhoods were built with their respective chapels of Los Reyes, La Asunción, Santa Ana, San Sebastian, San Andrés, Santa Barbara, San Lucas, Santo Tomás, San Marcos, Santiago, San Antonio, San Juan Evangelista, and San Miguel, of which only four still stand: Capilla de los Reyes (the Three Kings) and Capilla de la Asunción (the Assumption) in Atlatlhucan; San Juan Bautista in Texcalpan (feast day, June 24); San Miguel Arcángel in Tlatetelco (feast day, September 29).

Major festivals are Carnaval on the Fourth Sunday of Lent and the Festivity of Christ Appeared. According to Catholic tradition, Jesus made twelve appearances between his Resurrection and Ascension. This is celebrated in Atlatlalhucan in La Cuevita (the Little Cave). A brass band usually accompanies the Dance of the Chinelos during the festivals.

== Communities ==
- Atlatlahucan is the municipal seat. Its principal economic activities are farming and commerce. It has a population of 9,018, and it is 30 km (18.6 miles) from Cuernavaca and 91 km (56.5 miles) from Mexico City. *Fraccionamiento Lomas de Cocoyoc has 2,506 residents.
- Las Minas has 2,211 residents.
- Tlaltetelco (San Miguel Tlaltetelco) has 2,098 residents.
- Colonia San Francisco has 1,537 residents.
- San Juan Texcalpan has 1,505 residents.
- Colonia Kilómetro 88 has 1,099 residents.

The rest of the municipality is agricultural. Texcalpan is three kilometers from Atlatlahucan. Tepantongo is five kilometers from Atlatlahucan. San Francisco is four kilometers from Atlatlahucan.

== Geography ==
The municipality covers 71 km2 (27.4 square miles). The municipality of Atlatlahucan is based on a series of projections forming ravines that separate the hills of the municipality. The north part of the municipality and parts of the southeast are hilly, covering 7.4% of the surface area. Northern valleys cover 67%, and southern plains cover 25%.

Of the total surface, 3,000 hectares (7,400 acres) are used for agriculture and 3,990 hectares (9,860 acres) for forests. There are 1,846 ejido hectares (4,562 acres) and 3,990 communal hectares.

=== Climate ===
The climate is considered temperate-cold, with an average annual temperature of 20°C (68°F). There is 1,005 mm^{3} (35.6 inches) of annual precipitation.

=== Hydrography ===
Water resources include the ravine of El Salto or Totolapan (waterfall), which joins the Arroyo del Bosque (stream of the woods) in Oaxtepec, and the ravine that flows into the Yautepec River.

=== Flora and fauna ===
The flora consists mainly of pine-oak forest and pine forest. The fauna are white-tailed deer, raccoon, skunks, squirrels, volcanic mice, puma or mountain lion, Moctezuma quail, mountain hen, bellotera pigeon, blue magpie, goldfinch, Florida mulatto, red spring, rattlesnake, rat viper, frogs, and lizards.

== See also ==
- Governors of Morelos
- List of people from Morelos
