= Totolapan =

- City and Municipality
- Coat of arms

- Location within Morelos Location within Mexico
- Coordinates: 18°59′13″N 98°55′11″W
- Country: Mexico
- State: Morelos
- Founded: Between 1150 and 1350
- Municipal Status: May 17, 1930

Government
  - Municipal President: Sergio Omar Livera Chavarria

Area
  - Municipality: 67,798 km^{2} (26,177 sq mi)
- Elevation: 1,901 m (6,237 ft)

Population (2010) Municipality
  - Municipality: 10,790
- Time zone: UTC−6 (Zona Centro)
- Postal code: 62830 – 62835
- Area code: 735
- Website: totolapan.gob.mx (in Spanish)

Totolapan is a municipality in the north of the Mexican state of Morelos, surrounded by the State of Mexico to the north; to the south with Tlayacapan and Atlatlahucan; to the east and southeast with Atlatlahucan; and to the west with Tlalnepantla.

The city serves as the municipal seat for the surrounding municipality, with which it shares a name. The municipality reported 11,992 inhabitants in the 2015 census.

The toponym Totolapan comes from a Nahuatl name and means "birds on water". The full name is Totolapan de Montes de Oca. Fernando Montes de Oca was a cadet who died at the Battle of Chapultepec during the Mexican–American War in 1847.

== History ==
The Chichimecas were the first settlers, who called the land Totalapan. Between 1150 and 1350 the Xochimilcas entered the territory, and later by Moctezuma I. Totolapan belonged to the Aztec tributary province of Huaxtepec, and was ruled by a lord who was assisted by four judges selected by him, as well as multiple tequitlatos who governed the calpulli of the town. Maguey was a local product.

Hernan Cortés sent Gonzalo de Sandoval to Huaxtepec (Oaxtepec), also taking Totolapan in 1519, at the beginning of the Spanish Conquest.

After the conquest, the lands of encomienda were granted to Diego Olguín in 1536, but when the Marquisate of the Valley of Oaxaca was created, they were annexed to it.

The native population was evangelized by the Augustinians and the Monastery of San Guillermo Abad was built in 1545 under the leadership of Fray Jorge de Ávila. This is one of the Monasteries on the slopes of Popocatépetl that have been declared World Heritage Sites by the UNESCO.

In 1742 Totolapan and surrounding communities were integrated into Chalco, and on January 1, 1813, these became parts of Cuernavaca and Cuautla.

A comet seen in the area of Popocateptl volcano in 1910 was seen as an omen that convinced many inhabitants to join the forces of Emiliano Zapata in the Mexican Revolution. Bloody battles occurred at the monastery and on the Cerro de Santa Barbara.

Servio Omar Livera Chavarria of Panal (New Alliance) was elected Presidente Municipal (mayor) on July 1, 2018. One of his priorities is to reestablish law enforcement, as several communities have established self-defense leagues, and he wants to prevent lynchings, like the recent one in Tetela del Volcan.

The Indigenous community of Hueyapan became self-governing on January 1, 2018.

The state of Morelos reported 209 cases and 28 deaths due to the COVID-19 pandemic in Mexico as of April 27, 2020; one case was reported in Totalapan. Schools and many businesses were closed from mid March until June 1. On July 2, Totalapán reported 50 infections and four deaths from the virus; the reopening of the state was pushed back until at least June 13. Totolapan reported 22 cases, 10 recuperations, and four deaths from the virus as of August 31. Twenty-eight cases were reported on December 27, 2020.

On 12 October 2026, a security operation in the municipality targeting a suspected criminal leader triggered clashes, roadblocks and vehicle burnings. After authorities detained a man identified as "El Güero Gym", members of his group kidnapped three investigative agents, demanding his release. Authorities subsequently released the detainee to secure the agents' release. Four members of the National Guard died in a traffic accident while on their way to provide support.

== Localities ==
The town of Totalapan is composed of the four traditional barrios: La Purísima, Barrio San Agustín, Barrio San Marcos, and Barrio San Sebastián. There are three preschools; four public elementary schools, grades 1–6, (one for adults); and one middle school, grades 7–9. Totolapan is 59.2 km (36.8 mi) northeast of Cuernavaca and 97.8 km (60.8 mi) south of Mexico City.

In addition to the main town, there are other localities within the municipality: Ahuatlan (altitude 1,960 meters, population 510), Ampliacion San Sebastián, El Fuerte, San Sebastian (La Cañada), Nepopualco (altitude 2,040 meters population 1,957), Villa Nicolás Zapata, and Santa Bárbara.

The communities of Totalapan are primarily agricultural. Corn, beans, and oats are the primary crops, along with peaches, pears, apples, tejocote (a yellow fruit), and capulín (a type of cherry). Ranching includes cattle, pigs, goats, sheep, and horses; beekeeping is also significant. Nearly half the population are involved in construction and manufacturing.

== Attractions ==
There are several tourist attractions in Totalapan. The Ecological Park Los Venados (the deer) is in the community of Nepopualco. The hill of Santa Barbara is an excellent option for quiet walks during the day. This provides an excellent view of the town and was used as a lookout post during the Revolution. The hill of el Aljibe, which means "place where water is stored", is interred in the mountain. When people decide to visit this second hill, they can see ravines and fields. This involves a 40-minute walk to a cave which includes a cave with a cistern. A ceremony is held here every May 3.

There are also several colonial-era chapels. San Miguel y Santiago is in the town of Nepopualco, San Agustín is in Tepetlixpita, San Sebastián in the town of La Cañada, San Pablo in San Miguel, and ruins of the chapel of La Asunción are in Ahuatlán.

The main attraction is the Ex-Convento de San Guillermo de Abad, which dates from 1534 by Fray Jorge de Ávila of the order of the Augustinians and is part of the Monasteries on the slopes of Popocatépetl World Heritage Site. The monastery has an atrium designed for large processions. There are three posa chapels, including one attached to the main church, built for unbaptized Indians. The convent itself was built on a single floor, made of stone. It has a barrel vault, its facade is formed by a molded semicircular arch limited by two circular pilasters. The church has a wide altar with the image of San Guillermo. It also has several simulated monograms and ashlars, or carved stones. This is the only 16th-century convent with this type of decoration. The site is also unique because it is one of few that still includes the original garden area intact. The paintings in the interior of the church as well as the red geometric figures are well-preserved. The building has a great vaulted peak. Outside, the stucco facade was engraved with monograms and a stone carved with Christ. The side chapels include the original altars. There are two oil paintings reflecting the life of Fray Antonio de Roa. On the south side of the church, there is a large door that leads to the cloister of the convent. There is a painting that represents San Cristóbal. In the same area you can see paintings such as St. Augustine, works with plants, and other geometric motifs.

== Geography ==
Totolapan is located at 18°58' N, 98°55' W; surrounded on the north by the State of Mexico, south by Tlayacapan and Atlatlahucan; east and southeast by Atlatlahucan; and west by Tlalnepantla. It is at an altitude of 1,897 meters (6,224 feet) above sea level in the area known as Los Altos de Morelos. The most important mountain peaks are El Coaltepec (2,500 meters; 8,200 feet), el Huitzomayor (2,500 meters; 8,200 feet), el Partido (2,054 meters; 6,739 feet), and el Citlaltépetl (1,948 meters; 6,391 feet). Other peaks are Cerro del Loreto, Volcán del Aire, Cerro del Tezoyoc, Tepemapa, Santa Bárbara, Cerro del Texquistle, and Cerro Partido. Mountainous areas cover approximately 7.41% of the surface; the semi-flat areas 74.62%; plants cover 17.95%. The mountainous zones are mainly in the north and northeast of the municipality, although the south is also somewhat hilly. The foothills of the Sierra Chichinautzin and the Ajusco are semi-plains, whereas the center and south of the municipality have valleys and plains. There are sand mines in Colonias (neighborhoods) Lomas de Carril and Alta Palmira.

The municipality has an area of 57.33 km^{2} (22.14 sq mi), which represents 1.37% of the state's total. There are no significant waterways in the municipality. 3,406 hectares (8,420 acres) are for agricultural use, 75 hectares (190 acres) are for livestock, and 1,212 hectares (2,990 acres) are for forests. 100% of the land is ejidal.

The climate of Totolapan is Subtropical-humid, with an average temperature of 17.4 °C (63.3 °F) and annual precipitation of 913 millimeters (35.9 in). In the north there are forests of oak, pine, and madroño (Arbutus unedo), among others. In the south there are varieties belonging to the low deciduous forest: casahuate, tepehuaje, guaje, palo dulce, amate blanco, and copal. Fauna includes white-tailed deer, raccoon, skunks, squirrels, the mouse of the volcanoes, puma or mountain lion, Moctezuma quail, mountain hen, Bellaterra pigeon, blue magpie, goldfinch, Florida mulatto, red spring, rattlesnake, viper rat, frogs, and lizards.

== See also ==
- List of people from Morelos
