= Tlayacapan =

- Town & Municipality
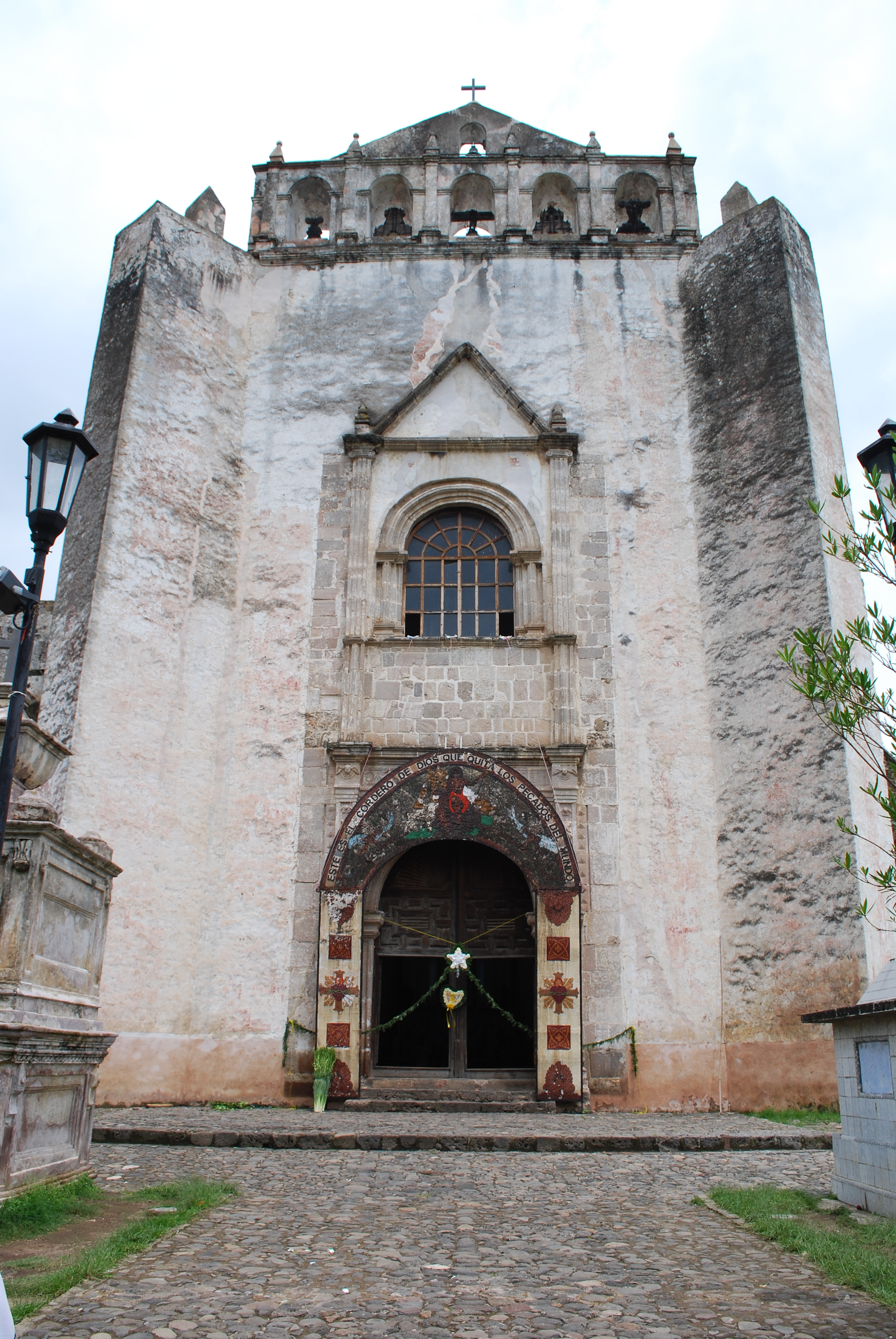
- Facade of the San Juan Bautista Church

- Location in Mexico
- Coordinates: 18°57′20″N 98°58′52″W
- Country: Mexico
- State: Morelos
- Founded: 15th century

Government
  - Municipal President: Rodolfo Juan Ramírez Martínez

Area
  - Municipality: 71.56 km^{2} (27.63 sq mi)
- Elevation (of seat): 1,640 m (5,380 ft)

Population (2005) Municipality
  - Municipality: 14,467
  - Seat: 7,399
- Time zone: UTC-6 (Central (US Central))
- Website: (in Spanish) site

Tlayacapan (Spanish pronunciation: [tlaʝaˈkapan]) is the name of a town and a municipality located in the northeast part of Morelos state in central Mexico. It is located 60 km east from the state capital of Cuernavaca and about 1.5 hours south of Mexico City. It is a rural area, whose way of life has not changed much over the 20th century, with 90% of its population still partially or fully dependent on agriculture. The town has old mansions, houses with red tile roofs and streets paved with stones. Many ravines crisscross the area and are crossed by numerous stone bridges.

The main landmark is the former monastery of San Juan Bautista, which towers over all the other structures. It was built beginning the 1530s, along with 26 chapels scattered around the original town as part of the "spiritual conquest" of the area. Today, this monastery is part of the Monasteries on the slopes of Popocatépetl, which was made a World Heritage Site in 1994. Culturally, the town is famous for two things: being the origin of the Chinelos dance and the home of the Banda de Tlayacapan band, the most important culturally in the state and nationally recognized.

Tlayacapan was also a popular filming location for many Mexican and American films such as La Valentina, starring María Félix and Eulalio González, and Two Mules for Sister Sara, starring Shirley MacLaine and Clint Eastwood. American rock band The Killers, filmed the music video of their hit song When You Were Young, in 2006.

== Landmarks ==
=== The monastery ===
Towering over everything else in the town, is the former monastery of San Juan Baustista (John the Baptist). This monastery is part of the series of monasteries near the Popocatepetl volcano which was declared a World Heritage Site in 1994. Today only the church portion retains its original function and serves as the parish church for the municipality. The patron saint of the town is John the Baptist, whose feast day is celebrated on 24 June.

The monastery complex was constructed by the Augustinians between 1534 and 1574, along with a number of chapels scattered throughout the town. It is fronted by an atrium which is larger than in any other monastery complex in the state. The facade of the church has small images of suns and moons. Its complex is a mixture of a number of architectural styles including Roman, Medieval, Plateresque, Gothic and Moorish. The church is one of the largest in Morelos. Despite its importance, the building lacks altarpieces and decorative elements in its architecture. The number 12 is found in all of its corners, 12 foundations, 12 doors, 12 main rooms, and others. The total comes to 144, the number of walls of the "perfect city" described in the Apocalypse. The main nave of the church measures 14 meters wide, 28 meters tall and 56 meters long, and match those of the Santi Quattro Coronati basilica in Rome. One of the main attractions of the monastery museum are the frescos in the entrance hall and meditation hall. The paintings in the entrance hall were done for evangelization purposes. The monastery's church remains with its original function. The rest, such as courtyards, cloister, chapels, dining hall, prayer rooms, kitchen, gardens, and monks’ cells have disappeared or have been converted to other uses.

The cloister area and part of the open chapel have been converted into a site museum. This museum contains pre-Hispanic artifacts, Catholic religious objects, religious paintings from the 17th century and more. One item which stands out is a painting of "Nuestra Señora de la Luz" an oil work of the Virgin Mary pregnant. It is claimed that from whatever angle the work is viewed, the Virgin appears to be looking directly at the onlooker. Two other important pieces are anonymous paintings from the 16th century with Flemish influence presenting Saint Augustine and pictorial fragments from an altarpiece from 1737. The museum also contains a number of mummified remains on display. These were found under the floor of the main nave of the monastery church in 1982, when restoration work was being performed. These remains are of several children and one adolescent, each found in its own wooden coffin and in good condition. They were identified as upper-class Spanish due to their dress. The belief at that time was to be buried in the church as close to the altar as possible in order to reach heaven sooner. Today they can be viewed in the museum in the room which used to be the dispensary. For this reason and others, photos inside the museum area are strictly prohibited.

The museum area underwent more restoration work in 1997 which was funded by the INAH, the Instituto de Cultura de Morelos, and the American Express Foundation. Much of this work involved the cleaning and restoration of the murals in the cloister area. Some of the best preserved works are in the Sala Profundis or meditation room where there are depictions of the Four Evangelists, Saints Peter and Paul, the Virgin Mary and the Crucifixion.

=== The chapels ===
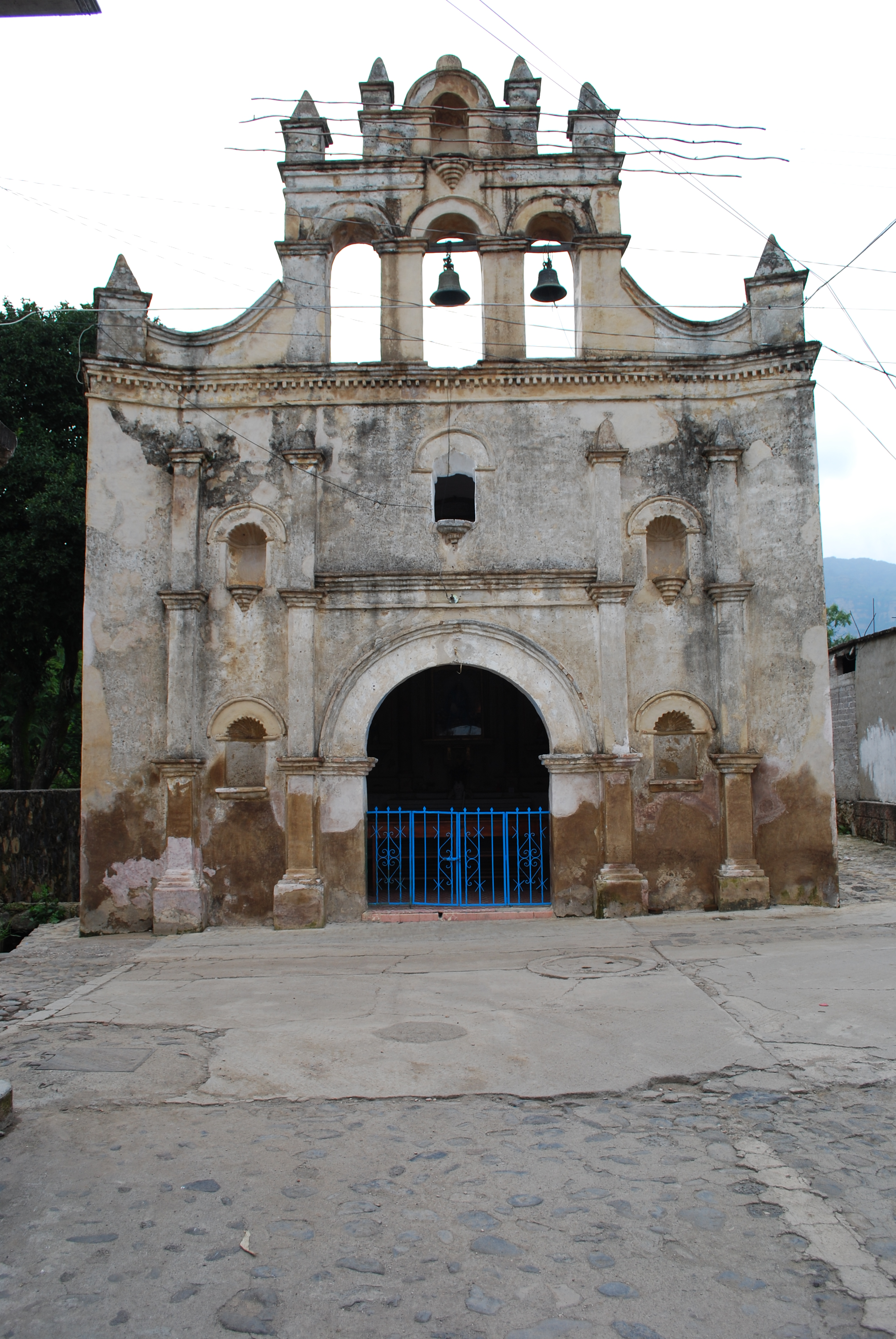
Capilla del Rosario

Associated with the monastery is a series of 26 chapels, which were located in places were pre-Hispanic rituals had been performed as part of the "spiritual conquest" of the area. Some of these chapels have been abandoned and are in ruins. Eighteen remain in use and are being gradually restored. These chapels are divided into three groups, Capillas de Cabecera (main chapels), Capillas de Calpulli (family chapels), and Capillas de Relación. While some are simple, even humble structures, several of the chapels are surprisingly elaborated with decorative facades, towers, espadañas and decorative gateways, some dating from colonial times. Each of the chapels has its own feast day and each neighborhood has its own chapel.

It has 21 chapels associated with it, classified into three groups: capillas de cabecera capillas de calpulli and capillas de relacíon. The most important of these are the capillas de cabecera or roughly "head chapels" which include El Rosario, Santa Ana, Señor de la Exaltación and Señor Santiago. These four chapels mark the four pre-Hispanic neighborhood temples or teocallis in each of the cardinal directions, in the same relative location vis-à-vis the main teocalli, where the monastery is now. Santa Ana is found in the north, La Exaltación in the south, Santiago in the east and El Rosario in the west.

The chapel of the Señora del Rosario (Our Lady of the Rosary) is one that marks the town's traditional western boundary and lends its name to the surrounding neighborhood. It has an east–west orientation and is paired with the chapel of Santiago (St. James) on the east side of town. It is adorned with stucco filigree, with seven niches in the body and three in the bell areas. It used to be said that when the bells of this chapel sounded, hunger would go away. Festival of the Señora del Rosaio is 7 October, with toritos de luces (small bull shaped frames with fireworks), festival and wind bands.

The chapel of Santa Ana (St. Anne) is located in the north of the town. Its facade is very sober and contains a medallion of the saint, which was placed there in 1973. Inside, the saint is represented along the Virgin Mary and the infant Jesus. This is the only chapel which does not have a canon vault but rather a gothic style one. Each year, pilgrims to Chalma leave from and return to this chapel. The neighborhood around it, called Barrio Norte or Barrio Santa Ana was the traditional exit to Mexico City. The chapel of Santa Ana is the scene of the commemoration of the Virgen de los Dolores (Virgin of the Sorrows) on the sixth Friday of Lent and the Procession of the Holy Burial (Santo Entierro) during Holy Week.

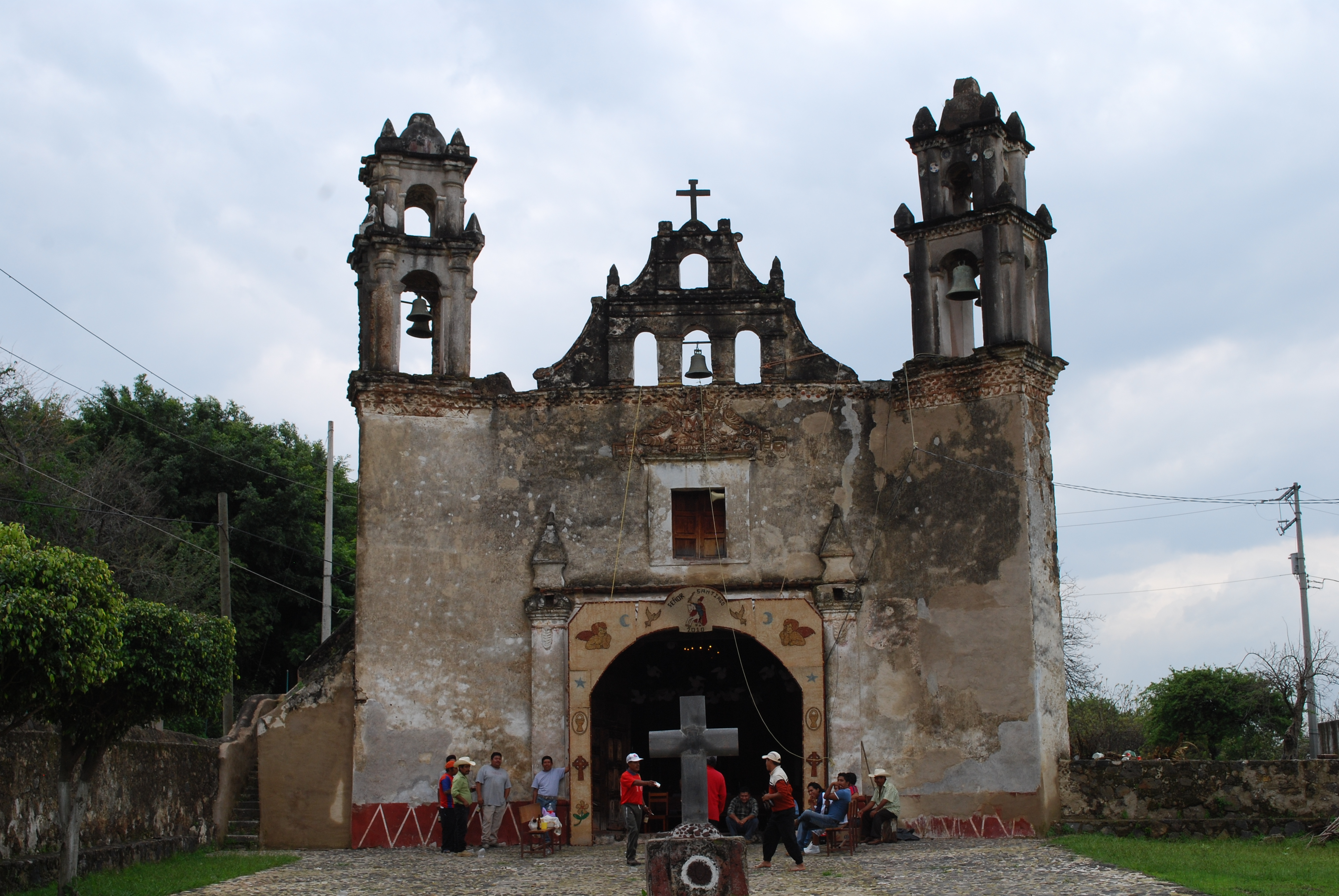
Capilla Santiago

The Santiago Chapel is found in the Santiago neighborhood, which used to be called Texcalpa, or the "witch" (male) neighborhood. Here are found many of the town's potters making everyday items such as pots for mole. The interior of this chapel is more decorated than most others with multicolored winged angels and saints. There is a three-gate opening into the atrium. The original atrium cross was decorated with flowers but this was stolen some time ago, as well as a number of other objects from the chapel property. The original doors remain, decorated with a mixture of symbols representing stars, suns and people. The squares with depictions of the sun and moon are considered to be particularly important. Each bell tower is decorated with Talavera tiles as well as stone spheres, which contain certification as to their perfection. Feast day is 25 July and celebrated with pre-Hispanic dance.

The Capilla de la Exaltación, also called Capillas de La Cruz, is located in the south. It contains an image of a Black Christ said to work miracles and is the object of local pilgrimage. The day of the Señor de la Exaltación is the first Friday of Lent, with events from Thursday evening to the following Sunday, such as pre-Hispanic dances and fireworks.

The capillas de relación, or chapels related to a specific ancient deity converted into a saint, consist of Nuestra Señora del Tránsito, San Lucas, San Pedro and San Jerónimo. The day of Nuestra Señora del Trànsito is the fourth Friday of Lent, with activities beginning on Wednesday and extending to Sunday. This consists of dances called jaripeos, fireworks and processions as the Virgin makes her way to Tepoztlán. One of the town's many legends involves the Virgen del Transito figure of the Virgin Mary, which was originally from Tepoztlan. This figure was burned and one was sought who could repair it in Tlayacapan. It is said that this figure "fell in love" with the figure of Saint Martin and wished to stay, so it became too heavy to lift. Today, the image has its own chapel in the far southwest of the community, but the figure itself remains in the chapel of San Martin.

The capillas de calpulli cover other types of sites in the four pre-Hispanic neighborhoods. They include San Jerónimo, Santa Marta, Santa Cruz de Altica, San Diego, La Magdalena, San Lorenzo, La Tlazcalchica, San Nicolás, La Concepcón, San Miguel, La Asunción, San Martín, La Natividad and Los Reyes. Those chapels on the outskirts, such as San Nicolás, San Pedro, San Lucas, Las Animas and El Transito, mark traditional exits from the pre-Hispanic village. The smallest chapels, also called ermitas (hermitages) mark topographic sites or other devotional areas. The festival of the Chapel of Santa Cruz of Altica is on 3 May, as well as the chapel of Tlazcalchica. The Capilla de la Natividad contains the Museo del Alfarero or Potters’ Museum.

=== La Cerería ===
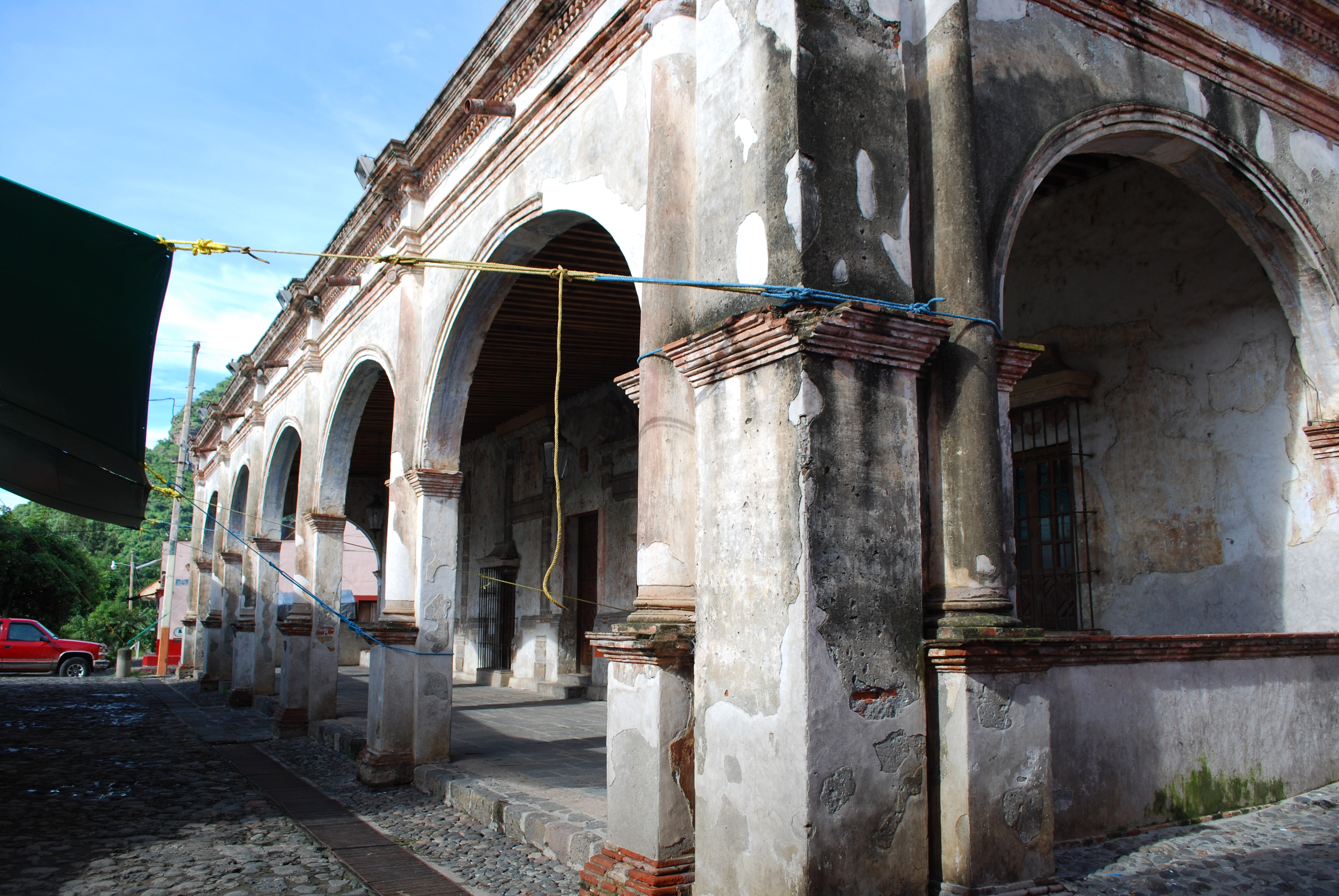
La Cereria

The Cerería Museum and Cultural Center (Wax or candle factory) is housed in a building which covers an entire city block and dates back to the 16th century. Its original function was the Encomendero Español or the headquarters for the local encomendero system. In the 17th century, it became one of the first waxworks in the Americas. This waxworks was noted in the region for making beautiful candles, and became a place to stock up on these for those traveling to and from Mexico City. The building was enlarged over time showing a number of different architectural styles. It contains a large alijbe or water storage tank in the main courtyard. There are also gargoyles. During the Mexican Revolution, the building served as a barracks for Emiliano Zapata’s troops.

The building was repaired and converted into its present function in the late 20th century. The restoration of the La Cerería was a common cause for the community, who were aided by researchers, scholars and other volunteers from outside. The rooms have been conditioned to display aspects of the municipality’s history and traditions, such as its pre-Hispanic past, its musicians, its pottery tradition, its numerous 16th-century chapels and the Chinelos. There are also two rooms dedicated to temporary exhibits. Workshops offered vary from crafts to personal development to languages such as English and Nahuatl to painting to chess as well as local traditions. The building has been used to film a number of movies because of its architecture.

=== Former Hacienda of San Nicolás ===
The former Hacienda of San Nicolás is located in the Pantitlán neighborhood, but it is in ruins. It is said that it originally belonged to Hernán Cortés who bequeathed it to a grandson named Pedro in the 16th century. The original owners supported the work of the local Augustinians and when then property first became abandoned, these brothers took it over. In 1809, the government confiscated it and it has remained government property since.

== History ==
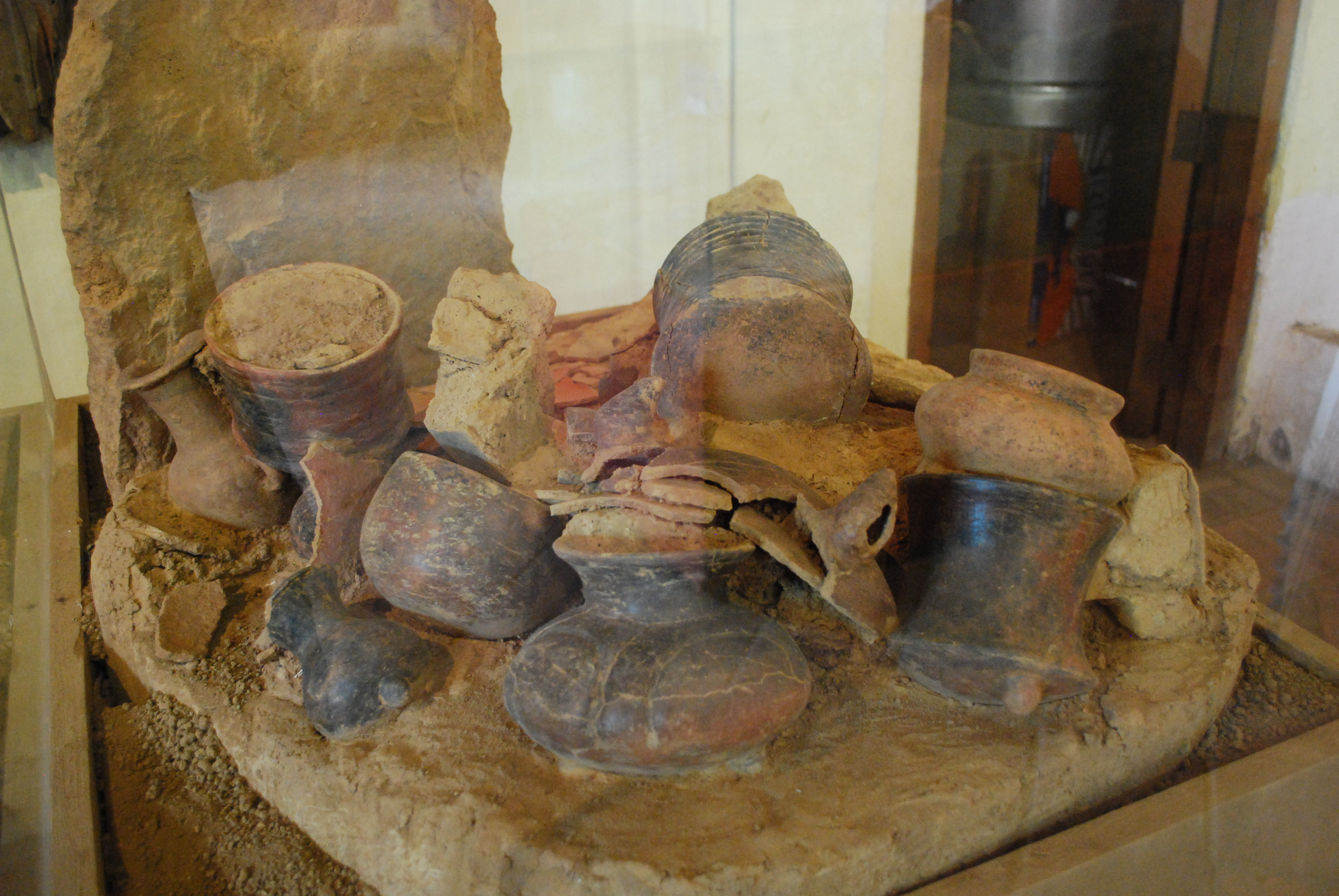
Artifacts from a local dig

The origin of the name is from Nahuatl and means "over the point or nose of the earth" but it can also be translated at "the limits of the earth."

=== Prehispanic Period ===
The first culture in the area was the Olmec, who are known only by archeological remains. Some of the archeological work done here was by Francisco Plancarte y Navarete, who was also the second bishop of Cuernavaca in the late 19th and early 20th centuries. He found a large number of Olmec clay figures here and other areas nearby.

Later in the pre-Hispanic period, the area became dominated by the Xochimilcas, who remained dominant until the arrival of the Spanish. The town of Tlayacapan dates back at least to 1400 C.E. when chronicles describe it as an important commercial center. The area was an important trade route between Tenochtitlan and points south. It has an important ceremonial center with altars dedicated to Tonantzin and other deities. This center was in the center of the town, where the monastery is now. The tecpan, or governor's palace was located where the municipal palace is now. The old market area retains its original function to this day. The pre-Hispanic town was ordered into four neighborhood aligned with the cardinal directions, called calpullis. These are marked by the four largest chapels in the town.

=== Conquest & Colonial Period ===
In 1520, while Hernán Cortés was still trying to conquer Tenochtitlan, the Spanish sent an expedition south of the valley into this area. In 1521, the Spanish fought the natives of Tlayacapan on the hill called Ziualopapalozink (Spanish: El Cerro del Sombrero). The Spanish left the area and headed for Oaxtepec, Yautepec and then to Cuernavaca and back to the Valley of Mexico. The lords of Tlayacapan sent many warriors to Tenochtitlan to help defend the Aztec Empire. Tlayacapan was not completely subdued by Cortés militarily until 1539. The "spiritual conquest" began with the building of the San Juan Bautista monastery and its associated chapels in the 1530s by the Augustinians. A total of 26 chapels would be built through the town over older significant pre-Hispanic sites. However, in the early colonial period, the indigenous would hide native deities such as Yacatecutli, the god of commerce, inside hollow figures of saints and march with them in procession.

=== 19th Century ===
The indigenous lost most of their property rights and most of the land became haciendas, such as the Hacienda of San Carlos Borromeo and the Hacienda of San Nicolás. Most would not have property rights again until 1874. However, during the rule of Porfirio Díaz in the late 19th and early 20th centuries, many indigenous claims would be thwarted in favor of the haciendas. Total restoration of rights came with the end of the Mexican Revolution.

=== 20th Century ===
During the Mexican Revolution, the Liberation Army of the South was based here for a time. Emiliano Zapata left from here to Chinameca, where he was assassinated.

From the colonial period to recent times, the area has been relatively isolated, keeping many of its old traditions, including economy intact. The highway connecting Mexico City to Cuautla was built through here in the latter 20th century, bringing traffic and some tourism. In 1994, the San Juan Bautista monastery was named as part of a World Heritage site officially named “Earliest 16th century monasteries on the slopes of Popocatépetl”.

=== 21st Century ===
A severe thunderstorm in August 2010, part of a system that brought widespread flooding to several states, overflowed ravines. These floods dumped debris and mud over most of the town's streets and flooded the atrium and interior of the Capilla del Señor de Exhaltación, one of the town's most important. Volunteers have since worked to clean and restore the building.

Five people were killed and 17 of 34 temples, including the Convent of St. John the Baptist, were damaged in the 19 September, 2017 Puebla earthquake. 80% of the municipal palace was damaged.

Erasmo Mendoza Pedroza of Juntos Haremos Historia (Together we will make history coalition) was elected Presidente Municipal (mayor) on 1 July 2018.

As of 7 May 2020, the state of Morelos reported 688 confirmed cases and 87 deaths from the COVID-19 pandemic in Mexico; two cases were reported in Tlayacapan. Schools and many businesses were closed from mid March until 1 June. The state office of DIF sent food and water to vulnerable groups of people in eight municipalities including Tlayacapan on 26 May. On 2 July, Tlayacapan reported three infections and one death from the virus; the reopening of the state was pushed back until at least 13 June. Tlayacapan reported 81 cases, 57 recuperations, and 19 deaths from the virus as of 31 August. One hundred six cases were reported on 27 December 2020.

== Culture ==
=== Carnival and the Chinelos ===
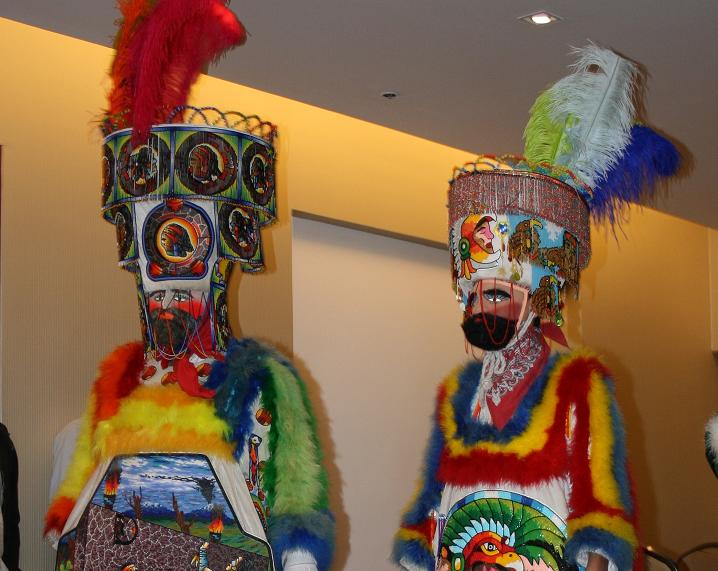
Two Chinelos

Carnival and the dance of the Chinelos are intertwined in the municipality. Each year since the colonial period, Tlayacapan has had a Carnival just before Lent. The dance originated here as part of Carnival. The name Chinelo comes from the Nahuatl word zineloquie, which means "disguised". During colonial times Spanish overlords were often cruel and oppressive to the mestizo and indigenous populations. During Carnival, masks were permitted and the dancers gradually took on an appearance designed to make fun of the Spanish. The gown mimics the nightgowns of Spanish colonial women, with white cotton gloves also serving to imitate these women. The ornate hat encrusted with fake jewels and large feathers mimics those worn by both sexes. The mask not only served to hide identity, but also they are made with wire mesh, painted pink, with heavy eyebrows and long pointed beards to mimic the abundant facial hair of Europeans. According to tradition, the hat was created by someone named Candido Rojas, the wire mesh masks by someone with the last name of Tlacomulco and the gown decorated with stripes and colored yoke by someone only known as "Barrabas". The dancers march through the streets, striking poses and making jumping movements, often inviting onlookers to join in. They are accompanied by local bands, playing traditional music and even songs and other musical compositions created just for them. This Chinelo tradition was copied and modified by many other towns in Morelos, starting with Tepoztlán, which has its own colors and style of hat. There are also Chinelo dancers in the southern boroughs of Milpa Alta and Xochimilco in nearby Mexico City. However, the dance is now a symbol of the state of Morelos.

Featuring the Chinelos dancing and marching through the streets, the Carnival tradition here is centuries old and held the days just before Ash Wednesday. By the time of the Mexican Revolution, the tradition had waned but it has made a comeback since the 1920s. Like with other versions of Carnival, the event is held for several days before Ash Wednesday but reaches its peak the night before on Tuesday. The annual celebration took root here during the colonial period in the mestizo and indigenous neighborhoods of the town, especially those who maintained strong indigenous traditions. One of these was the "nemontemi" or the five days at the end of the Aztec calendar, which occurred in early February, around the same time as the beginning of Lent. This event also marks the beginning of the dry season, when there is no agricultural work. Work moves to the management of stored grain and crafts.

On the day before Ash Wednesday, festivities begin at 10 in the morning with music and dance as well as fireworks. These wind through the streets on their way to the main square. The party continues in the square with music and food and rides and other attractions. However, the real festivities begin at sundown and continue until the stroke of midnight of Wednesday. Throughout the day and night, Chinelos can be seen dancing through the crowds. At its height, there are about 15,000 people crowded into the town center.

=== Banda Tlayacapan ===
A number of bands featuring wind instruments play during Carnival and other festivals, but the oldest and best known of Tlayacapan's wind ensembles is the Banda Tlayacapan. This organization was begun in 1870 by Vidal Santamaría, with only a chirimia (a traditional wind instrument) and some drums. It was originally called Los Alarcones. Soon after, other instruments such as tubas and saxophones were added. The band survived a number of historic events, such as the Mexican Revolution, as well as more mundane problems such as monetary disputes. Direction of the band has stayed with the Santamaría family, with Brigido Santamaria, who headed it for much of the 20th century, writing music for the band, such as Danza de los Chinelos and sons and preserving older traditional pieces that might have otherwise been lost. When he died in 1975, the band came under the direction of Carlos Santamaría who heads it today. The band received the 1998 Premio Nacional de Ciencias y Artes from President Ernesto Zedillo. 2010 marks the band's 140th anniversary. Many of the modern band's members represent generations of participation and the band is split into several sections for playing at different kinds of events such as traditional dances, civic events, and funerals. This band is culturally the most important in the state, and has traveled all over Mexico and the world.

=== Pottery and juego de aire ===
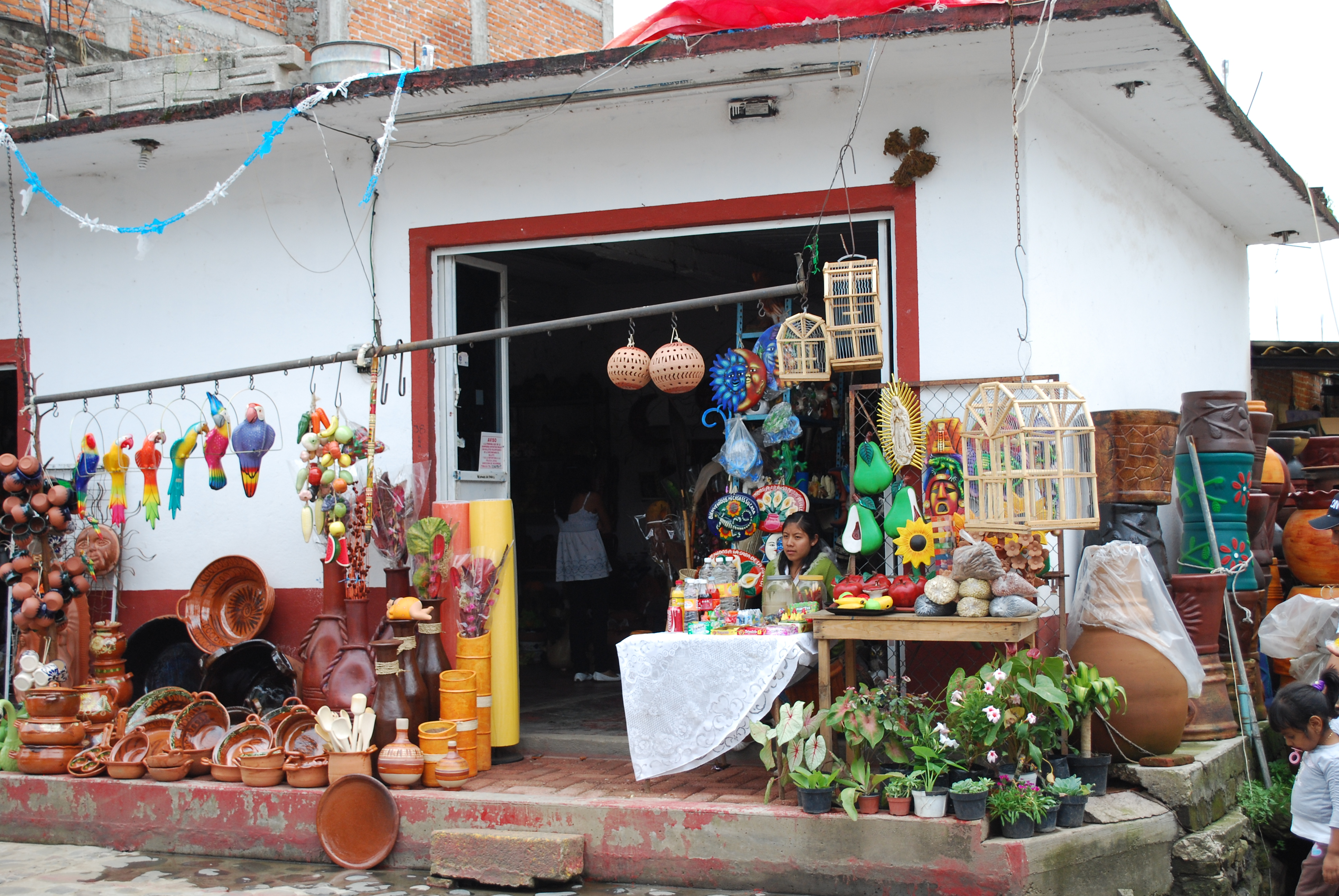
Crafts store on Carranza Street

Pottery has been made in the town since far back into pre-Hispanic times. Some of the oldest pottery found here is associated with the Olmec culture. One distinctive technique to the areas pottery is using cattail fluff as temper, mixing it into the clay. Pottery items include flowerpots, storage jars, figures, cooking pots, comals, jars, dishes and more. Many are glazed in various colors. To honor the tradition there is a Museo del Alfarero or Potters’ Museum in the Capilla de la Natividad and a festival dedicated to the craft. The Feria del Barro, also known as the Festival Cultural de Tlayacapan, was initiated by Cornelio Santamaría and is held each November. The 2009 Feria de Barro featured singer Susana Harp and groups such as Leones de la Sierra as well as the native Banda de Tlayacapan. The festival not only showcases the area's pottery but also has expositions of photography, other crafts and children's events.

One pottery tradition unique to the community is a set of figurines called a juego de aire (literally "air set"). This is a set of clay figures, which are used in ritual healing, especially of diseases associated with "bad air." The last craftsperson to preserve the art of making these is Felipa Hernandez Barragan. The set demonstrates a ritual healing scene with one figure, representing the sick person, and another representing the "curandero" or shaman-healer with a bird in his hand at the center. Around them are various animals: a lizard, a millipede, a snake, a bull, a donkey, a spider, a scorpion and a frog, each of which has a cigarette tied to its back. These animals represent the various aspects of nature. Tradition states that certain illnesses are due to "bad air" or to supernatural forces that become offended if certain courtesies are not observed. One of these courtesies is to greet and/or offer food to an ant hill when walking by. Another is to make an offering in ravines and other places where water flows. Most of these beliefs have pre-Hispanic roots.

=== Food ===
Traditional dishes include pipian (both red and green), tamales, various types of beans and tlacoyos. One local bean is called "ayocote" which is large and dark red. Avocado leaves are used to flavor food and dishes often feature tomatoes, tomatillos, nopals and a plant called huanzontle. Cecina (salted beef or pork) from the nearby town of Yecapixtla is popular as well.

== Geography ==
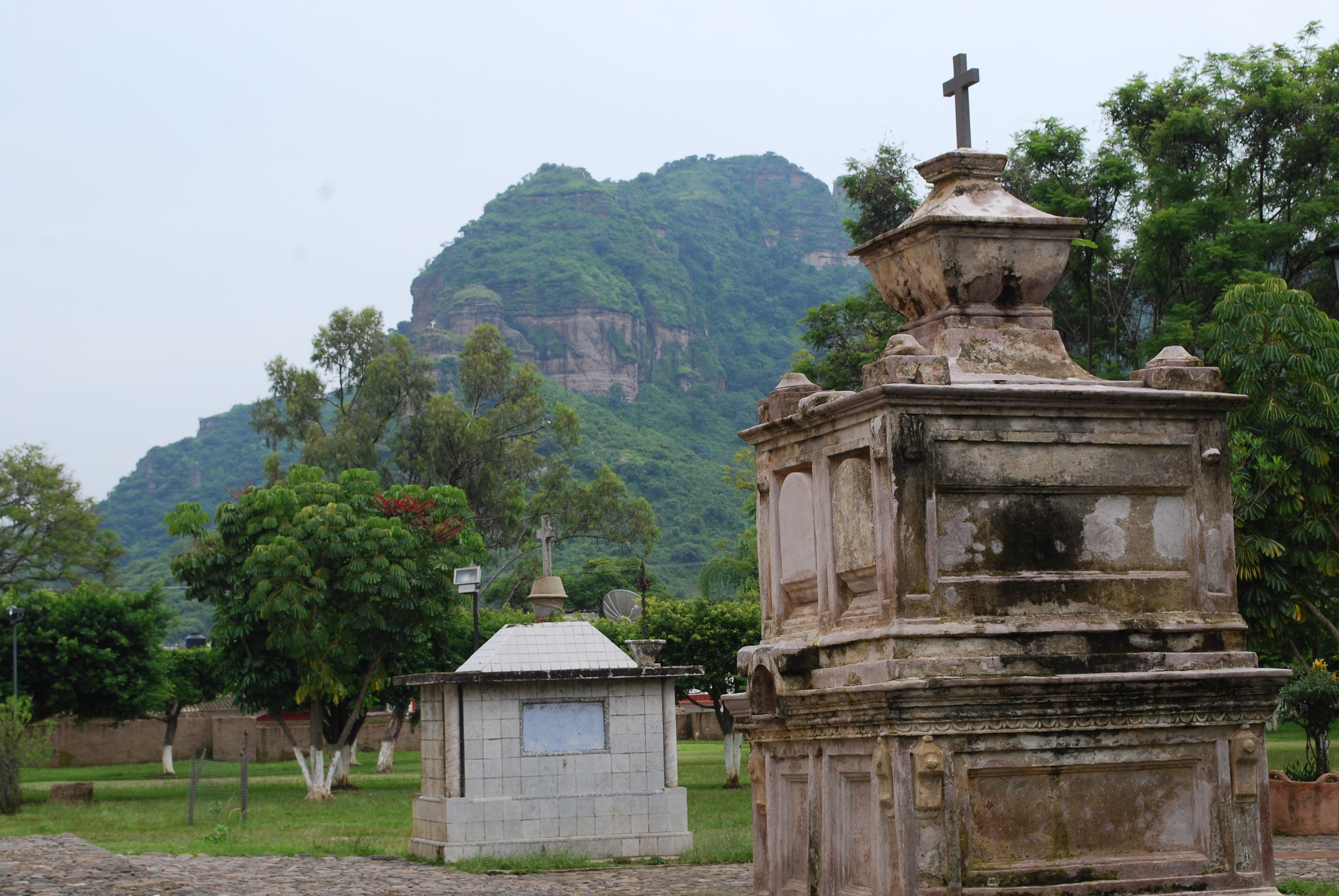
Cerro Sombrerito as seen from the atrium of the monastery

The municipality consists of the main town of Tlayacapan and 31 populated communities, which cover an area of 71.52 km^{2}. The largest community is Tlayacapan, which accounts for about half of the municipal population. Other significant communities include, Cuauhtempan (San Andrés Cuauhtempan), Los Laureles (San José de los Laureles) and Nacatongo.(inegi) The municipality borders the municipalities of Tlanepantla, Yautepec, Totolapan, Atlatlahucan and Tepoztlán. The municipality is a valley surrounded by a chain of low mountains, most of which belong to the Sierra de Tepozteco. Which have capricious forms. To the south are peaks known as Ventanilla and Sombrerito. To the west are Huixtlazink, Tlatoani and Ziualopapalozink, which is the highest. On the northwest side are Tezontlala, Cuitlazimpa and Tepozoco, and on the north side is Amixtepec. Most of these peaks are rounded, which give the area its Nahuatl name. One of the figures said to appear on one of the mountains is that of the mother goddess Tonantzin. Forty two other god images are said to appear in the mountain range. One legend states that the faces of these gods were sculpted by human hands when the king Quetzalcoatl came to this area and pronounced it sacred. The profile of Tonantzin has been identified with the Virgin of Guadalupe because it appears most readily in the morning of 12 December, this virgin's feast day.

=== Hydrography ===
There are no permanent rivers but there are seasonal ravines that crisscross the valley floor. The largest of these include Tepanate, Chicotla, Huiconchi and Santiago.

=== Climate ===
The climate is temperate and semi humid. Most rain falls during the rainy season in summer and early fall. Average temperature is 16C. Prevailing winds run south to north.

=== Wildlife ===
There are mostly small mammals with some deer and the occasional puma. There are a number of bird species such as storks and owls and a number of reptiles and amphibians. There are also many varieties of spiders. Tlayacapan is included in the nature preserve called Chichinautzin, which was established in 1988.

== Economy ==
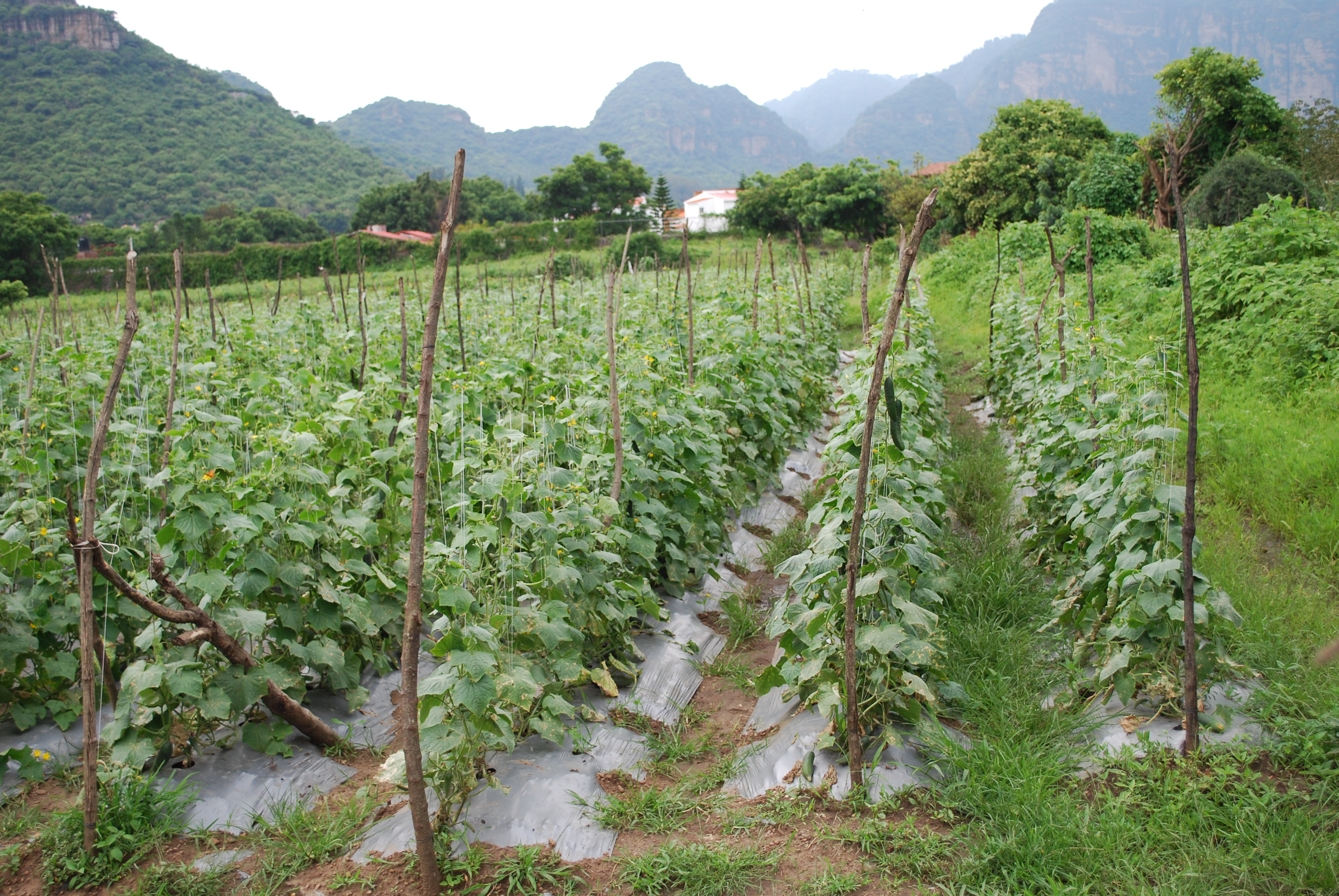
Cucumber field with mountains in the background

The area's economy is decidedly rural; however the overall municipality is not considered to be economically marginalized. One community is ranked as extremely poor and eleven ranked as poor, accounting for just under 2,200 of the municipality's total population.

Agriculture and livestock form at least part of the economic base for over 90% of the population. Almost all farming occurs during the rainy season from June to October. Important crops include tomatoes, corn, beans, squash and cucumbers. However, the growing of tomatoes has decreased due to plant infestations, costs of herbicides and insecticides and falling market prices. Most of the municipal land was held communally in ejidos until recent constitutional changes allowed more land to pass into private hands.

While agriculture remains the backbone of the area's economy, pottery is important culturally. This area's pottery has been produced the same way since the colonial period, with many of the same designs. Most workshops are family owned and generational, although only 1% of the population makes a living this way, and most is made in the Texcalpan or Santiago neighborhood. In addition to its own pottery, a number of stores have become distributors of crafts from other parts of the state as well as from Michoacán, Querétaro, Guanajuato and Puebla.

Mining was done there in colonial times but there are no records indicating exactly where. Some stories indicate that gold was mined in the Tlatoani Hill and silver in Popotlán. Some openings in these mountains have been found but have not been explored. The area has deposits of lime, plaster, andesite, basalt and other volcanic rock, but these are not currently exploited.

Tourism is also considered important, due to attractions such as the former monastery and the La Cerería museum, but this only employs 0.25% of the population. There are 23 stores in the municipality. Tourism and commerce together employ 7.3% of the population. Tlayacapan is part of the Ruta del Volcan, which is a tourist route set up by the state tourism trust. This route also includes Tepoztlan and Yecapixtla, with the "volcán" referring to the Popocatépetl volcano. Due to its "historic attributes", there have been calls for the town to become a "Pueblo Mágico" (a program sponsored by the federal government), and it is being considered for inclusion.

== Demographics ==
As of 2005, only 488 people were counted as speaking an indigenous language, down from 784 in 2000, accounting for only 3,8% of the overall population. Few emigrate from here, but there is a fair amount of immigration from states such as Guerrero, Oaxaca and Puebla.

The population in 2015 was 17,714, up from 13,851 in 2000. Almost all residents profess the Catholic faith.

== Transportation ==
The major highway through the town connects the municipality with Mexico City to the north and Cuautla, Morelos to the south. There is another highway that connects the area with Yautepec de Zaragoza. Several bus lines provide service to the area including Cristóbal Colon and Estrella Roja. Local public transportation provides service to local areas as well as Oaxtepec.

== Tlayacapan in media ==
=== Films ===
- Yo... el aventurero (1959), starring Antonio Aguilar
- La Valentina (1966), starring María Félix
- Lucio Vázquez (1968), starring Antonio Aguilar
- Butch Cassidy and the Sundance Kid (1969), starring Paul Newman and Robert Redford
- Lauro Puñales (1969), starring Antonio Aguilar
- Two Mules for Sister Sara (1970), starring Shirley MacLaine
- La presidenta municipal (1975), starring María Elena Velasco
- OK Mister Pancho (1981), starring María Elena Velasco
- Salvador (1986), starring James Woods and Jim Belushi

=== Music videos ===
- When You Were Young, by The Killers

=== Television series ===
- Un refugio para el amor (one episode)

== See also ==
- List of people from Morelos
