= Juan de Tecto =

Belgiam misionary

Juan de Tecto (born in Ghent, 1468; died in Honduras, 1526) was a Flemish missionary to the New World.

== Biography ==
He graduated as D.D. in Paris, and was for several years professor of theology in the Sorbonne University, and afterward chaplain of Emperor Charles V, and guardian of a convent of Franciscans at Ghent. In 1522 Charles V, who was much attached to him, gave him permission to go to the New World. Tecto settled at Texcoco, where he founded missions for the natives and learned their language.

He accompanied Hernán Cortés in his expedition to Hibueras in 1525, and as, owing to the rebellion of Cristobal de Olid, no provisions were obtainable, Tecto, exhausted, fell behind the army, and was found later by a patrol leaning against a tree, where he had died of hunger. According to Bernal Diaz del Castillo, another source, he was sent by Cortés to report to the emperor about the conquest of Hibueras, and died at sea, off the coast of Spain.

Tecto is the author of two works: Primeros rudimentos de la doctrina Cristiana en lengua Mexicana (Rudiments of Christian Doctrine in the Mexican Language), a manuscript which was utilized by Fray Pedro de Gante for his Catecismo Mexicano (Mexican catechism); and Apología del bautismo administrate á los gentiles Mexicanos con sola el agua y la forma Sacramental, which is cited by Fray Juan de Torquemada in his Monarquía Indiana.
