= Actopan, Hidalgo =

City in Hidalgo, Mexico

Actopan
- City
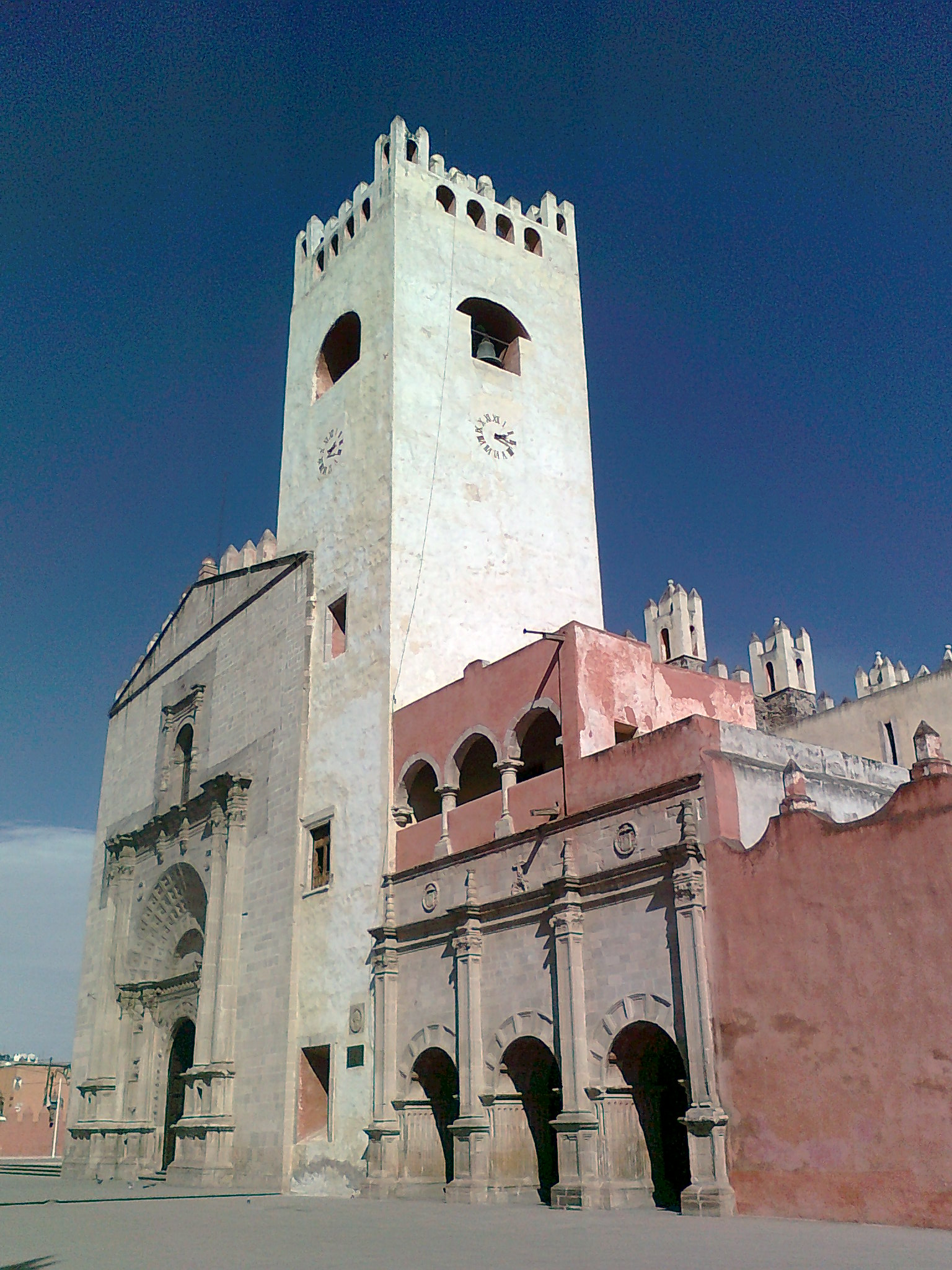
- Church and Convent of San Nicolás de Tolentino

- Location within Hidalgo Location within Mexico
- Coordinates: 20°16′05″N 98°56′39″W
- Country: Mexico
- State: Hidalgo
- Municipality: Actopan

Government
  - Federal electoral district: Hidalgo's 3rd

Population (2020)
  - Total: 32,276
- Time zone: UTC-6 (Central)
- Website: actopanhidalgo.gob.mx

Actopan (from Nahuatl: Ātocpan 'thick, humid and fertile land') is a Mexican city, head of the municipality of Actopan in the state of Hidalgo. Actopan is widely known for its gastronomy, especially for ximbo and barbacoa, as well as for the Church and ex-convent of San Nicolás de Tolentino.

The city is located north of Mexico City, from which it is 120 km away, and only 37 km from the city of Pachuca de Soto, the capital of the state of Hidalgo. It is located within the geographical region known as Mezquital Valley. According to the results of the 2020 Population and Housing Census of INEGI, the town has a population of 32,276 inhabitants, which represents 52.91% of the municipal population.

The city was a settlement of the Otomi people. In 1117 it was conquered by Chichimeca groups and became a dependency of Acolhuacan in 1120. It was conquered by the Tepanecs of Azcapotzalco at the end of the 14th century. The Mexica conquest took place in 1427 during the reign of Itzcoatl. After the Conquest of Mexico, an encomienda was established in Actopan. According to the Universal Dictionary of History and Geography, the city was founded on July 16, 1546; although the date on which the anniversary of its founding is celebrated corresponds to July 8. In 1575 Actopan was elevated to the category of village.

It was elevated to Alcaldía Mayor in 1568; Actopan was the head and the towns around it were then República de Indios (Republic of Indigenous People). Later it became Subdelegation in the period of the Bourbon Reforms; and it acquired the character of City Hall and head of party, dependent on the district of Tula, on August 6, 1824. On April 26, 1847, by decree of the Congress of the State of Mexico, Actopan was elevated to the category of town.

On October 15, 1861, Actopan was declared a district of the State of Mexico. On June 7, 1862, it became part of the military canton number 3 of the Second Military District of the State of Mexico, created to confront the French intervention in Mexico. At the beginning, Actopan was temporarily the capital of the district, but it was changed to Pachuca. During the Second Mexican Empire, Actopan became part of the department of Tula. In 1869, the decree of establishment of the state of Hidalgo confirmed the character of District head of the new entity.

The Constitution of Hidalgo of 1870 recognized Actopan as the 1st district, category that would be confirmed in the 1st article of the electoral laws of 1880 and 1894. In the 3rd article of the Constitution of Hidalgo of 1 October 1920 it appears in the list as municipal seat, and in it is included as municipal seat of the municipality number 3 of Hidalgo. When commemorating the fourth centennial of the foundation of Actopan, on July 8, 1946, the XXXVIII Legislature of the Congress of the state of Hidalgo, gave it the category of city.

== Toponymy ==
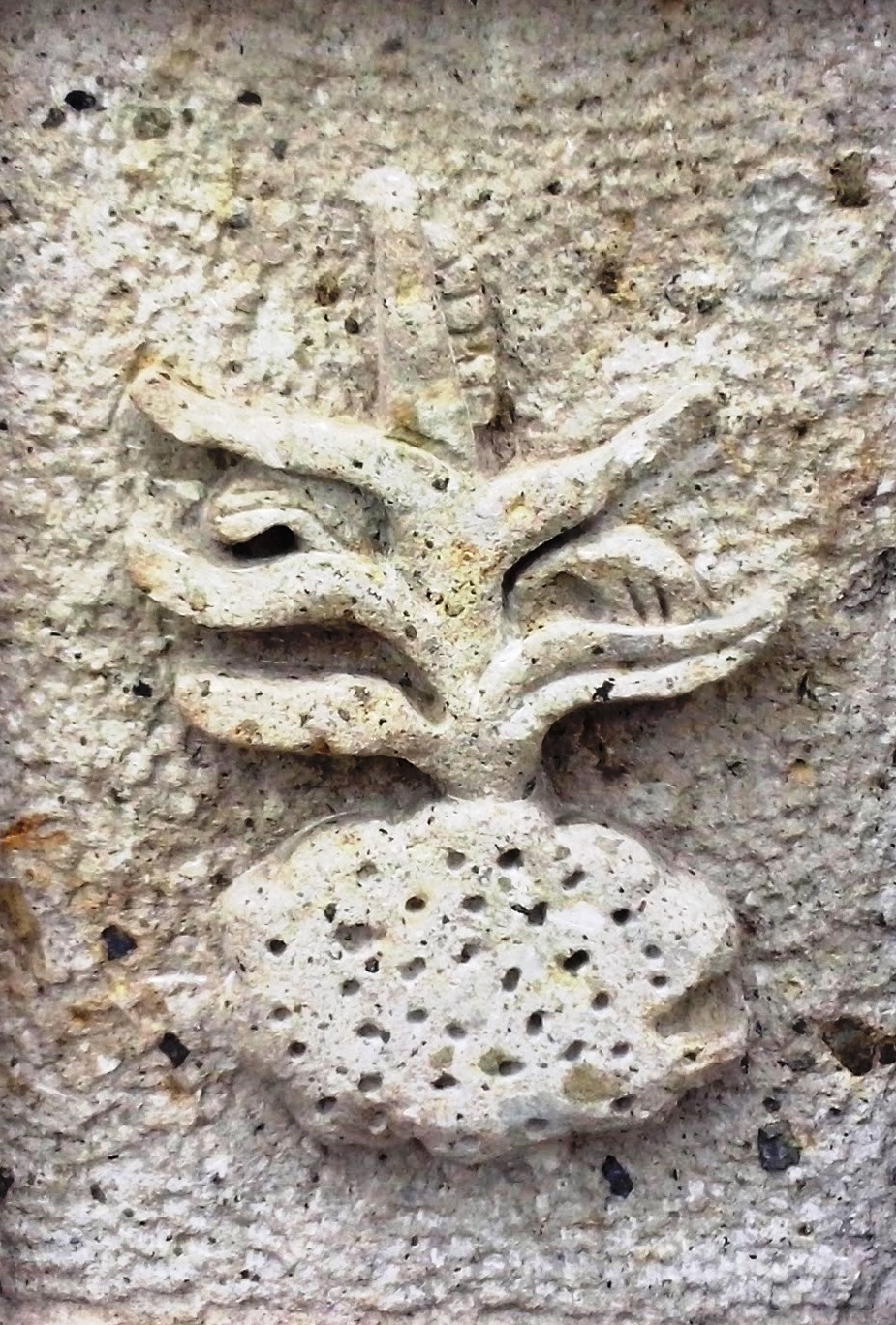
Actopan glyph relief in the Rotonda de los Hidalguenses Ilustres.

Some sources indicate that the word Actopan comes from the Otomi language, the INAFED in the Encyclopedia of the Municipalities and Delegations of Mexico in its page on Actopan, Hidalgo indicates the etymology of the word comes from Otomi; but in the page of Actopan, Veracruz it indicates that the etymology comes from Nahuatl. Enrique Rivas Paniagua, in the book Lo que el viento nos dejó: hojas del turruño hidalguense, points out that the name of no municipality in Hidalgo has roots in Otomi.

The word Actopan is of Nahuatl origin, derived from atoctli, which means 'thick, humid and/or fertile land', and pan, which means 'in' or 'on', so the translation would be as follows: "on thick, humid and fertile land". Another meaning is that it comes from ac root of the word (atl) that means water, to (' toktok) that means buried and pan that means locative, on, in; so its meaning would be "on buried water".

It has also been pointed out that the name of the locality could be Atocpan, which due to a certain modification of the language suffered a change in its structure; Otocpan, cited in the "Archivo Español de Arte y Arqueología del Obispado de México"; and Atecpan, of Nahuatl origin and meaning "in the pond".

The name of the settlement of the Hñähñu people before the Conquest of Mexico in the Otomi language was: Ma'ñuts'i, Mañutzi, or Mañutshí. An etymological meaning given is that it comes from the possessive ma, which means 'my', un, which means 'road', and itzi, which is diminutive, so it would translate as "my little road". According to the linguists, Ethel Emilia Wallis and Yolanda Lastra, another meaning is that it comes from ñuts'i, which means to light or incense (to perfume with incense) and the possessive ma, so it would translate as "Place of lighting or incensing".

== Symbols ==
=== Glyph ===
The glyph, (engraved or, by extension, written or painted sign) that represents the city is made up of a corn cane in corn silk and elotes on a clod drawn as a disk, sown inside with dots or coarse grains. This representation is commonly used as the city's escutcheon.

=== Name ===
The official name is Actopan, although it also receives the denomination of Ciudad del Convento or in a longer way Ciudad del Convento y la Barbacoa. This is due to the importance of the Church and ex-convent of San Nicolás de Tolentino and the typical dish of the city, the barbacoa. On November 14, 1861, being part of the state of Mexico; it was called Actopan de Hidalgo, in honor of Miguel Hidalgo y Costilla. At the end of the 19th century, it fell into disuse so as not to sound cacophonous with the name of the state.

=== Motto ===
After the puma sightings in 2017, in the north of the municipality, in 2019 the Actopan City Hall registered the brand "Territorio Puma" (Puma Territory), as part of the identity for districts that are habitat of this feline.

== History ==
=== Pre-Hispanic period ===
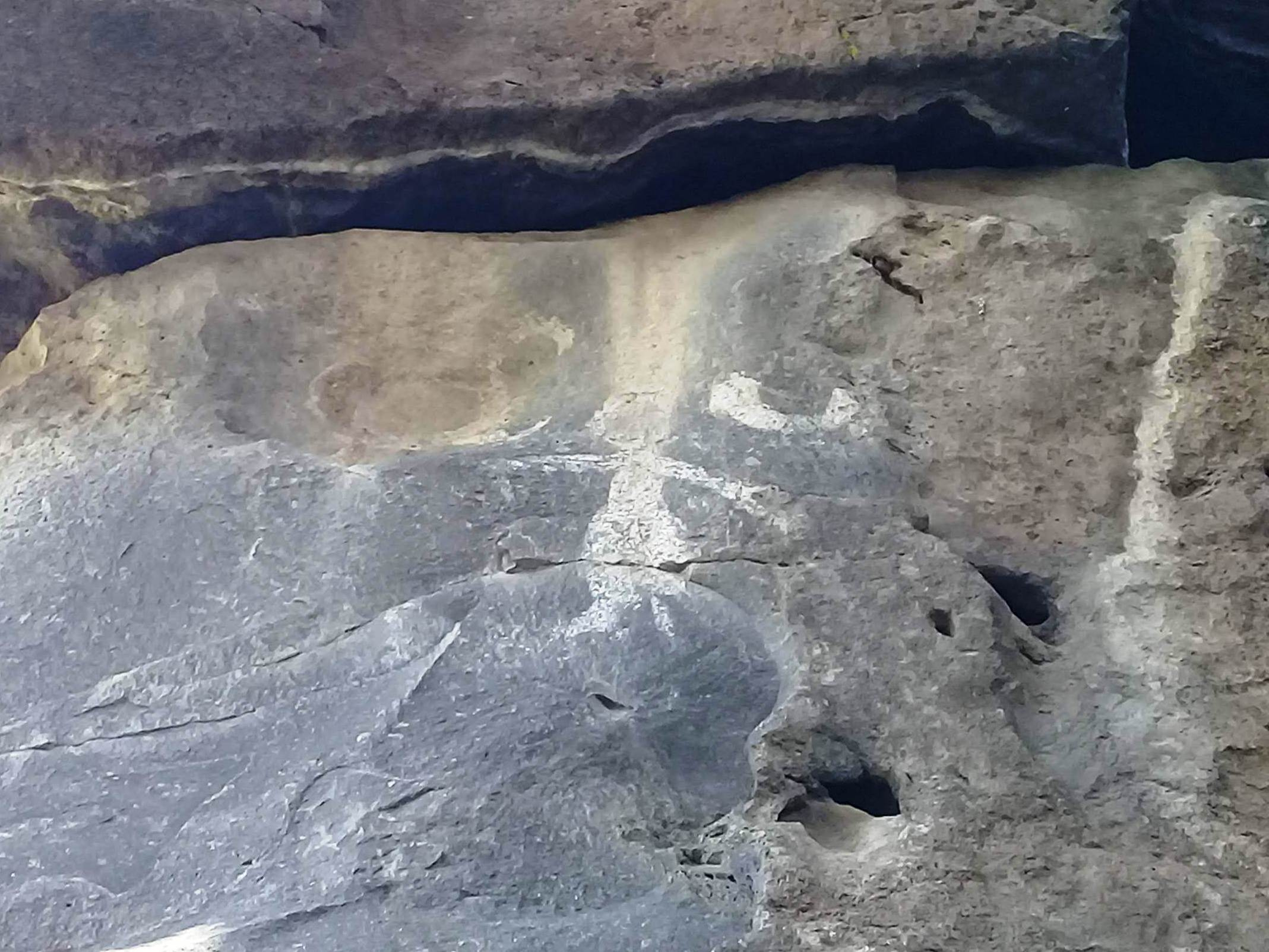
Cave paintings, located next to the Actopan Aqueduct. It emphasizes the figure of a woman, in her right the sun and in her counterpart the moon in last quarter.

At an unknown date, the Otomi people founded the village. Around the year 644 the Toltecs made their appearance, and this caused the town to be divided into two parts that continued to exist at the time of the Spanish conquest: Tetitlan and Actopan. By the year 1113, the Otomi people, under the command of Xide, arrived in the region. In 1117 the town was conquered by Chichimeca groups, and because of this invasion, it became dependent on Acolhuacan in 1120.

Actopan and Ixcuinquitlapilco were conquered by the Tepanecs of Azcapotzalco at the end of the 14th century. The Mexica conquest took place in 1427 during the reign of Itzcoatl. Almost always mentioned together in chronicles and relations, Actopan and Ixcuinquitlapilco were Otomi communities with Chichimeca-Pame minorities. During this time Ixcuinquitlapilco was the most important town in this region.

Historian Peter Gerhar mentions that Actopan was first visited by the Spaniards before the conquest was consummated, at the end of 1519 or beginning of 1520. By 1521 the indigenous people of the area and other nearby parts, participated in the defense of the territory under the command of the tlatoani Cuauhtémoc against the Spanish conquerors. On August 13, 1521 Tenochtitlan fell to the troops of Hernán Cortés and his allies. Between 1521 and 1524, a certain political-military control was established in almost all the territories subject to the Mexica empire, including Actopan.

=== Viceroyalty of New Spain ===
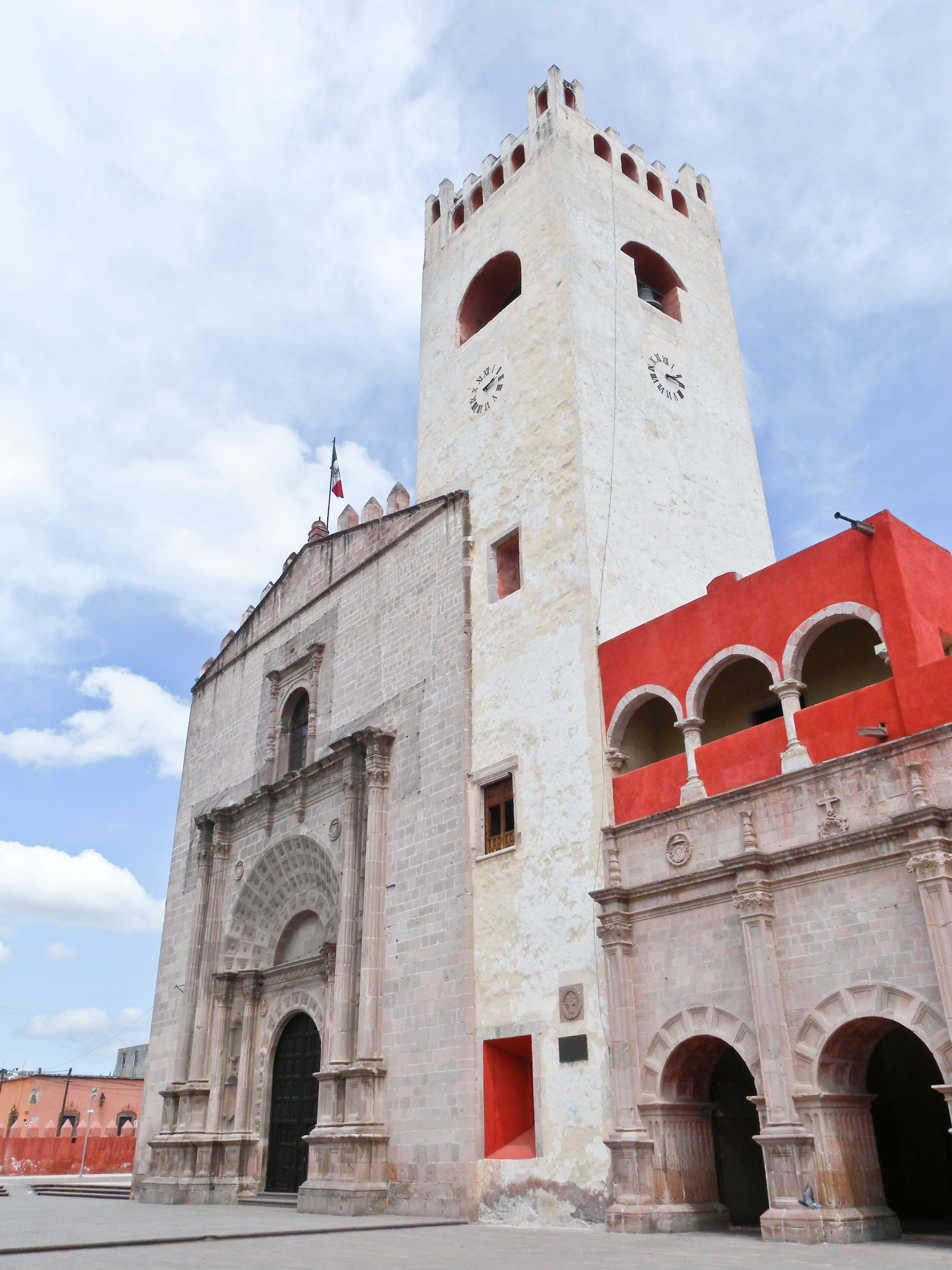
Church and Convent of San Nicolás de Tolentino

The first encomenderos of Actopan were Hernando Alonso and Juan González Ponce de León. Ixcuinquitlapilco became a corregimiento in 1531, with Actopan depending on it.

Subsequently, the encomienda was assigned to Rodrigo Gómez de Ávila, who in 1538 ceded his rights to his son-in-law, Juan Martínez Guerrero. The latter was succeeded by his son, Agustín Guerrero de Luna. By 1540 the encomienda of Actopan belonged to Juan Guerrero, who had inherited the encomienda from his wife, the daughter of the conquistador Francisco Gómez.

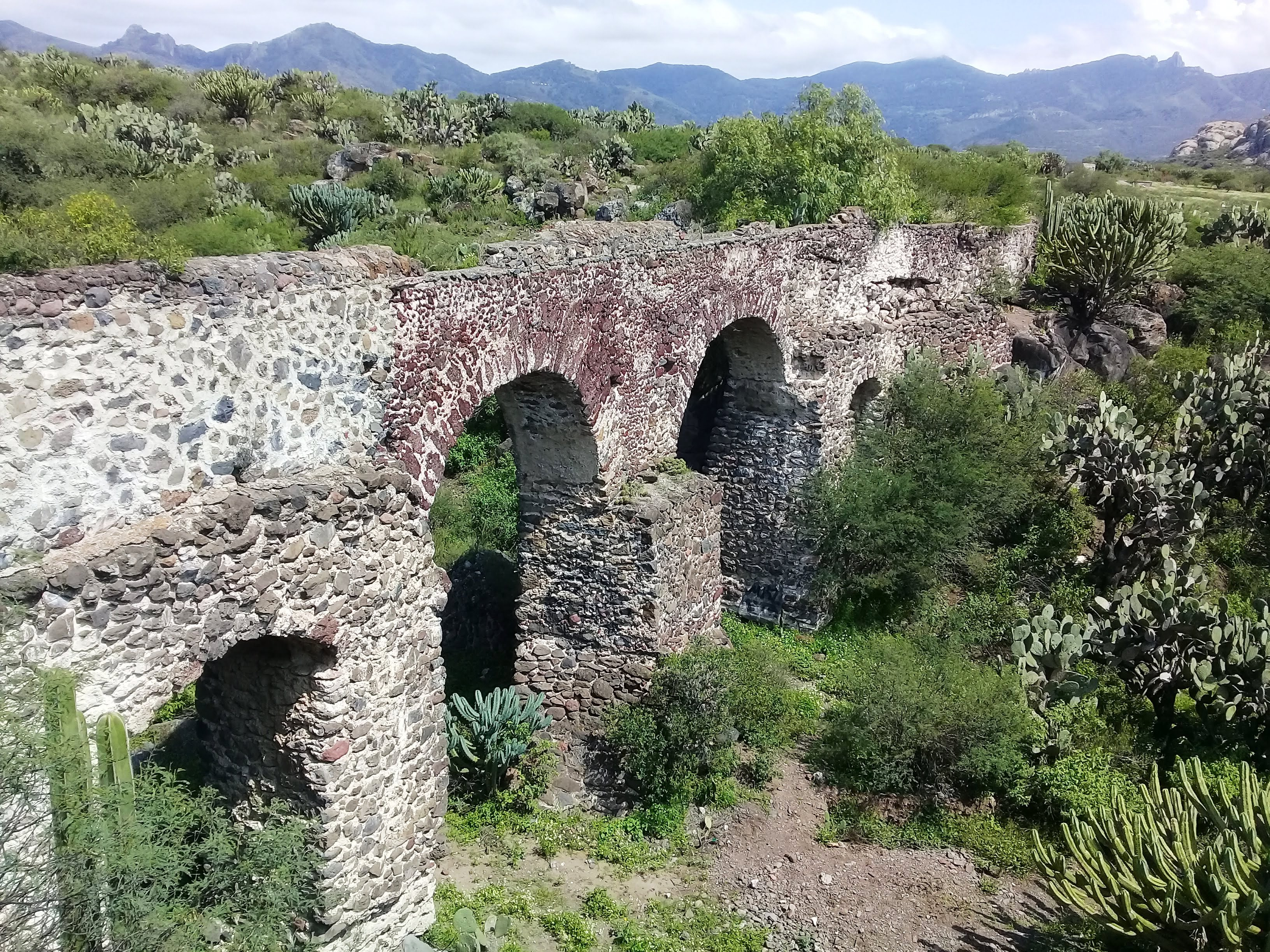
Major arcade of the Actopan Aqueduct, which was 11,000 varas long (about 9194.96 m).

The water supply was one of the main problems of the town, in 1546 the construction of an aqueduct began. Also in 1546 the Church of Actopan was founded; it is said that the Augustinians, upon seeing the topography of Lxcuinquitlapilco, decided to change the head of the town to Actopan. The first record of baptism in the Church of Actopan that is known is dated July 8, 1546, date that coincides with the foundation of the curate. From 1550 to 1560 the Convent of San Nicolás de Tolentino is built; and the work is attributed to Fray Andrés de Mata.

The first attempt to form a congregation of indios (native indigenous people), coinciding with the founding of the convent, was not completely successful, due to the fact that the indios abandoned the towns and returned to their old lands. In 1560, Actopan became a dependency of Pachuca, but it was separated, and became Alcaldía mayor in 1568; Actopan was the head and the towns around it were the República de Indios. The convent was the dividing line between the indigenous republics of Ixcuintlapilco and Actopan, to the southeast was Tenantitlán, a town subject to Ixcuintlapilco, and to the northwest, Actopan. The description of Fray Juan de Medina, in 1571, contained in the "Description of the Archbishopric of Mexico", mentions that in Ixcuintlapilco there were 4000 tributaries, in Tenantitlán 1300 and in Actopan 7000.

It is known that by the 1570s, the convent complex was already completed, with three main buildings: the open chapel, the church and the convent; in addition to the stables, the orchard and a water supply system of great proportions for community use. In 1575 it was granted the category of village. In 1576 the prior of the convent, Fray Melchor de Vargas, printed the first catechism in Otomi. In 1580, Actopan sent 90 indios to work in the mines of Pachuca.

Beginning in 1593, a second effort was made to form congregations of indios; In 1604, Friar Esteban García, in his "Chronicle of the Province of the Most Holy Name of Jesus of Mexico", reported that in Actopan, the lieutenants and bailiffs forced them to leave their former places, burning their houses and plots of land. In 1615 the quota of workers that Actopan sent to work in the mines of Pachuca was established, 22 indios every two weeks. Between the 16th century and the first half of the 17th century, there was a demographic drop in the Indigenous population in Actopan, in 1571 there were 7500 tributaries, while by 1599 these had decreased to 2984. In 1643, there were 1092 tributaries, and in 1688, there were 1509.

After the revolt of 1677 in Ixmiquilpan, where the indios revolted not to work in the mines, a commissioner arrived in Actopan to take away crews, but the indios mutinied and resisted. In 1681 the prosecutor advised that the indios of Actopan should not be forced to work in the mines. Forced labor in the mines was reinstituted in Actopan until 1722. On January 5, 1722, a notification arrives from the mayor of Pachuca to send the workers batches to the mines. On January 7, a delegation arrived from Pachuca to insist on the sending of the batches. On January 9, 1722, the governors began to organize the batches and the indios of the jurisdiction of Actopan revolted to prevent the reinstatement of the mining distribution system. On January 11, the militia arrived from Pachuca, there were no confrontations, but groups of indios remained in the exits of the capital.

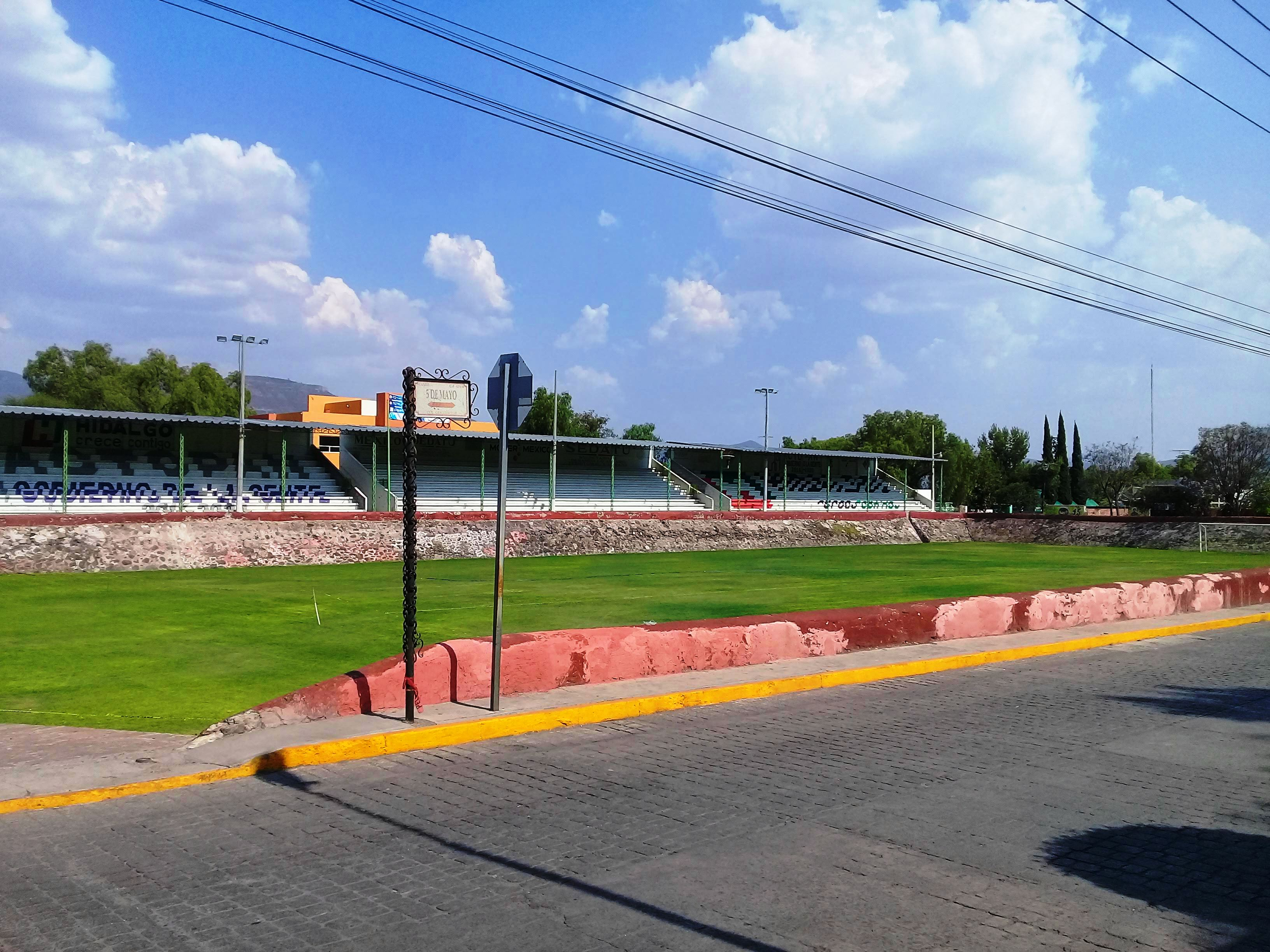
Los Frailes Sports Complex, better known as "El Jagüey". According to a news published in the Gaceta de México, on August 9, 1785, a jagüey was inaugurated in the city.

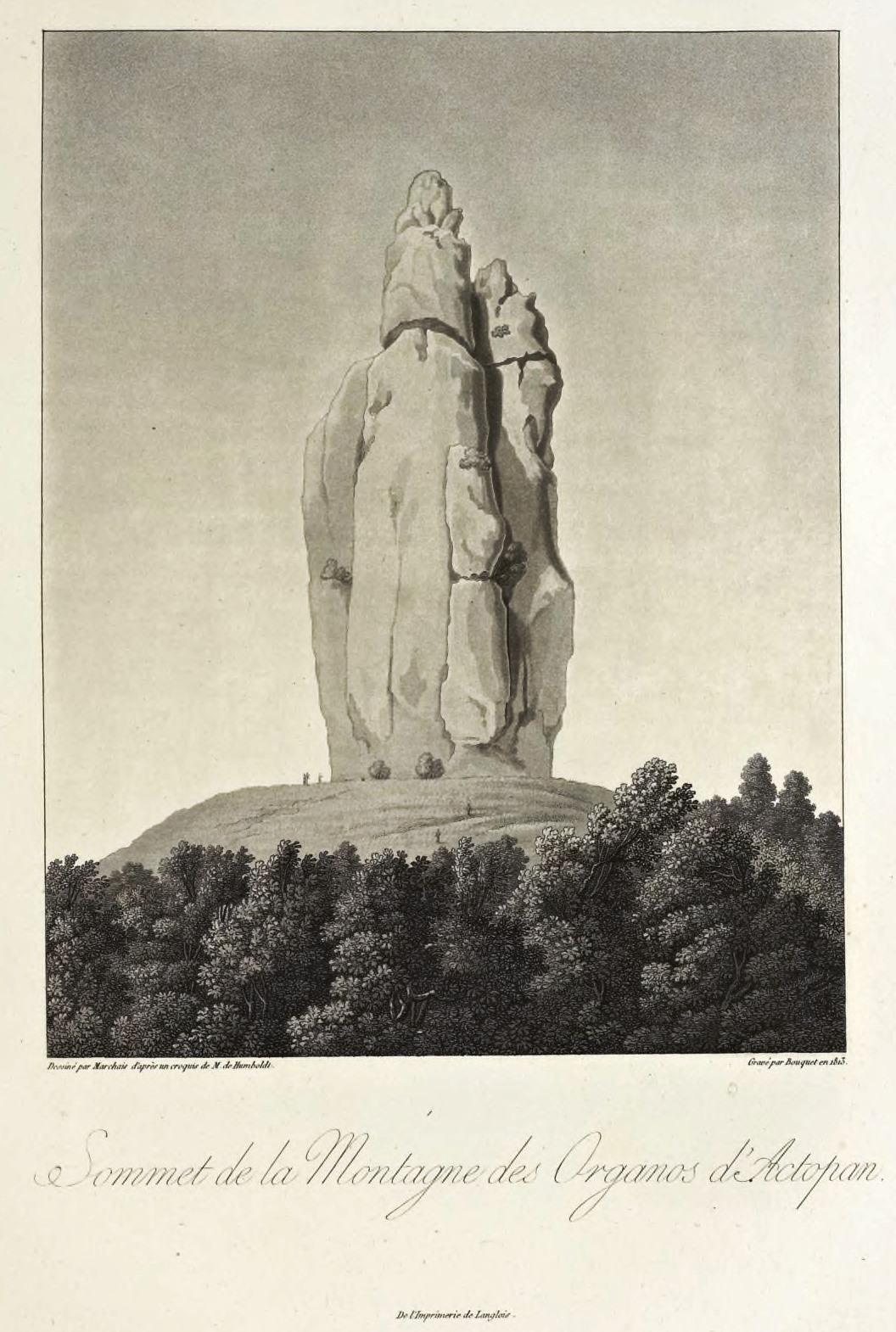
Organs of Actopan, by Alexander von Humboldt, which he drew during his visit to the region.

On January 16, 1722, a retinue from the viceroy arrived in the jurisdiction, in which it was ordered to proceed with the pacification, apprehension of the culprits, as well as the effective implementation of the repartimiento. On January 22, only two involved were apprehended and taken to jail. The indios of Actopan had to accept the work regime, with the exception of the town of Santiago Tlachichilco (Santiago de Anaya). In a regular way the repartimiento was carried out until the year 1724, on January 10, 1724, some indios rose up again against the repartimiento. Not many joined the rebellion and with the militia that the Mayor was able to gather, it was enough to dissuade the mutineers. On September 2, 1724, the viceroy approved the exemption of the repartimiento for all the towns in the jurisdiction of Actopan.

In the 1740s, José Antonio Villaseñor y Sánchez, in his book Theatro Americano, mentions that the municipality had a total of 13 subject towns and had a population of "fifty families of Spaniards and twenty of mestizos and mulattos and other people and two thousand seven hundred and fifty families of indios, all of the Otomí language, distributed in all its subject towns". It also mentions that to the east is Tetitlán, and subject to it the towns of Magdalena, San Jerónimo, Ixcuintlaplico, and San Agustín Tlaxiaca. And the partiality of Actopan to the west with its towns, which are Santiago Tlachichilco, Santa Bárbara Lagunilla, San Salvador, Santa María Amajac, San Miguel, and Yolotepec. On November 16, 1750, the Convent of Actopan became part of the Archdiocese of Mexico, and the first priest was the parish priest Juan Barrera.

On April 19, 1757, a new request was made for the distribution of workers in the Pahuca mines, at the request of Pedro Romero de Terreros. The following day, the general lieutenant mayor of Actopan, Andrés de Aguilar, received the order and notified the governors of the Actopan and Tetitilán partiality. Both governments accepted the order, but said that they could only organize crews of 60 workers from Actopan and 50 from Tetitlán. On April 27, with the escape of a squad that was on its way to Real del monte, the mutiny of the indios of the jurisdiction began. A part of the rebels, hiding in the Meje hill, tried to take the town. But the defense of the town had already been organized by the Spanish militia, with whom the rebels engaged in fierce combat. On April 30, 1757, the mutineers sent a letter to the vicar priest asking for peace.

On May 15, 1803, Alexander von Humboldt arrives in Pachuca, visits the mines in the area and on May 21 leaves for Atotonilco El Grande. On May 22 he spent the night in the town of Baños de Atotonilco near the Villa de Magdalena and the Puente de Dios. During May 23 and 24 he would travel through the Actopan Valley, and then leave on May 25 for Mexico City. During the visit, Humboldt drew and studied the Organs of Actopan, also known as Los Frailes, located 17 km southeast of Actopan in the municipality of El Arenal. Humboldt determined their height trigonometrically.

=== Independence and Independent Mexico ===
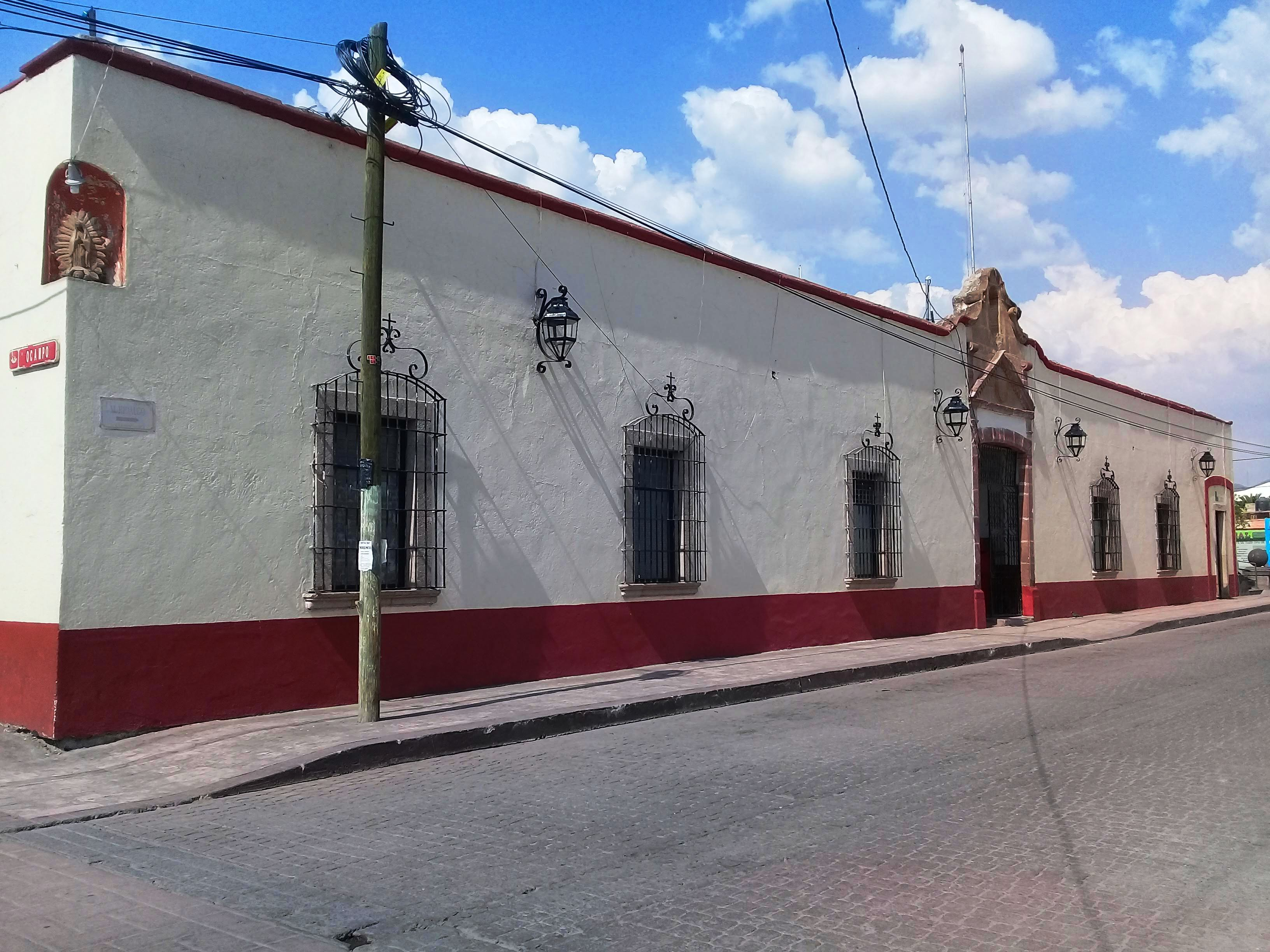
Old Municipal Palace of Actopan, built in the 18th century.

Regarding the participation of the city in the Independence of Mexico, in February 1812, the royalist, Domingo Claverino arrived to the city. Between 1824 and 1825 different deaths by measles occurred; the registry was raised by the parish priest of a neighboring town, before the death of the person in charge of the registries in Actopan.

In 1847, it received the title of town, given by the Extraordinary Legislature of the Congress of the State of Mexico. During the French Intervention in Mexico, to organize the Mexican Army, on June 7, 1862, the President of Mexico, Benito Juarez, decreed the division of the State of Mexico into three military districts, the second formed by the territories that integrate the State of Hidalgo, for which he designated Actopan as capital and named Pedro Hinojosa as commander. The lack of infrastructure to house the authorities of that locality, forced to change the headquarters to the city of Pachuca.

On October 11, 1863, General D. Tomás Mejía took over the city, defeating General Herrera y Cairo, Governor and Military Commander of the second military district. In May 1864, the authorities of Actopan and San Agustín Metzquititlán, recognized the Second Mexican Empire. After the erection of the state of Hidalgo, different towns were proposed to be the seat of the capital, among them Actopan. On January 8, 1869, the news arose that Actopan would be designated as the capital, supposing that such designation was to distance the government from the influence of the Real del Monte and Pachuca Company; however, the city was rejected for not having the necessary infrastructure.

In July 1869, Julio Chávez López, who led a revolution against the government, was defeated when he tried to take the city. He was taken to Chalco, where he was shot in the courtyard of the Escuela del Rayo y del Socialismo in September 1869. On December 2, 1871 Sotero Lozano attacked Actopan; but he retreated to return being defeated by colonels Inclán and Villagrán. On September 16, 1875, the Pachuca-Actopan telegraph line was inaugurated. During the Tuxtepec Revolution on April 24, 1876, a combat between the forces of Colonel San Martin and the Porfiristas took place; the latter were forced to retreat. On July 22, the government troops commanded by General José María Flores, forced the Tuxtepecans to leave Actopan, which they had held for several days.

=== Porfiriato and Mexican Revolution ===
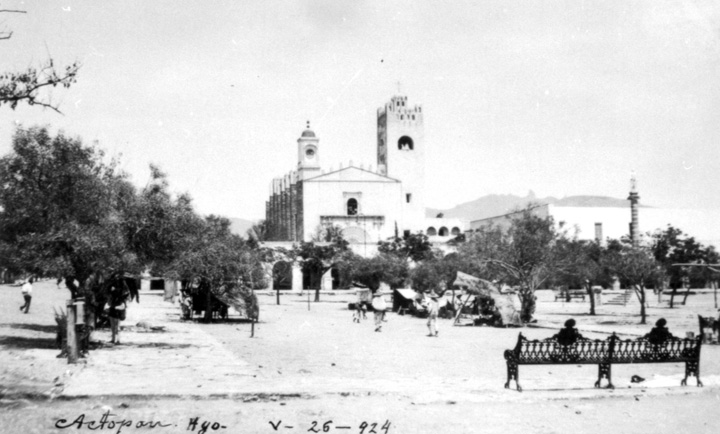
Main square of Actopan in 1924.

In 1898 the City Hall decreed July 8 as a municipal holiday. On May 17, 1898, lightning struck the Church of Actopan, wreaking havoc on the façade and destroying an altar. In 1900, the sewage canals from the drainage of Mexico City reached the jurisdiction of Actopan.

In 1910 the Club Antirreleccionista was founded, integrated by local youths. During the Mexican Revolution on December 1, 1910, the Municipal Assembly of Actopan protested by means of a Decree, its adhesion to President Porfirio Díaz Mori and against the initiated movement. The participation of the locality is minimal during the revolutionary process.

On May 22, 1911, Vicente Azpeitia Pardiñas, supporting the Maderista revolution, took the plaza of Actopan, immediately handing it over to Captain Roberto Martínez y Martínez, who was originally from the city. On July 5, 1914, Martínez y Martínez expelled the Huertista Army from the city. On July 16, 1914, the constitutionalist general, Nicolás Flores occupied the Actopan plaza; after the evacuation of the huertista Martin Zayas. On July 23, 1914, a manifesto was written by Nicolás Flores, published in Actopan in which he explains what has been and what is the conduct of the Constitutionalist Army.

In November 1914, Higinio Olivo was defeated by the villistas in Actopan. On August 17, 1915, near the town there was a combat between Carrancistas and Villistas, the latter being defeated. On September 2, 1915, Actopan and Ixmiquilpan were in the hands of the Constitutionalist forces commanded by General Odilón Moreno. In February 1919, the city was in the hands of Villistas forces that evacuated days later. On July 2, 1922, the garrison of Actopan, commanded by Salvador Mayorga, accompanied by the Rodriguez brothers, rose up in arms.

During the Delahuertista rebellion on January 1, 1924, Nicolás Flores issues a manifesto in Actopan, in which he makes it known that he has been named governor of Hidalgo by Adolfo de la Huerta. On January 4, 1924, a combat takes place in Chicavasco between the federal forces, under the orders of Colonel Julio T. Villegas, and those of General Cavazos. On January 5, a combat takes place between the federal and rebel troops of Generals Marcial Cavazos, Nicolás Flores and Otilio Villegas, and those of Colonel Francisco López Soto.

=== 20th century ===
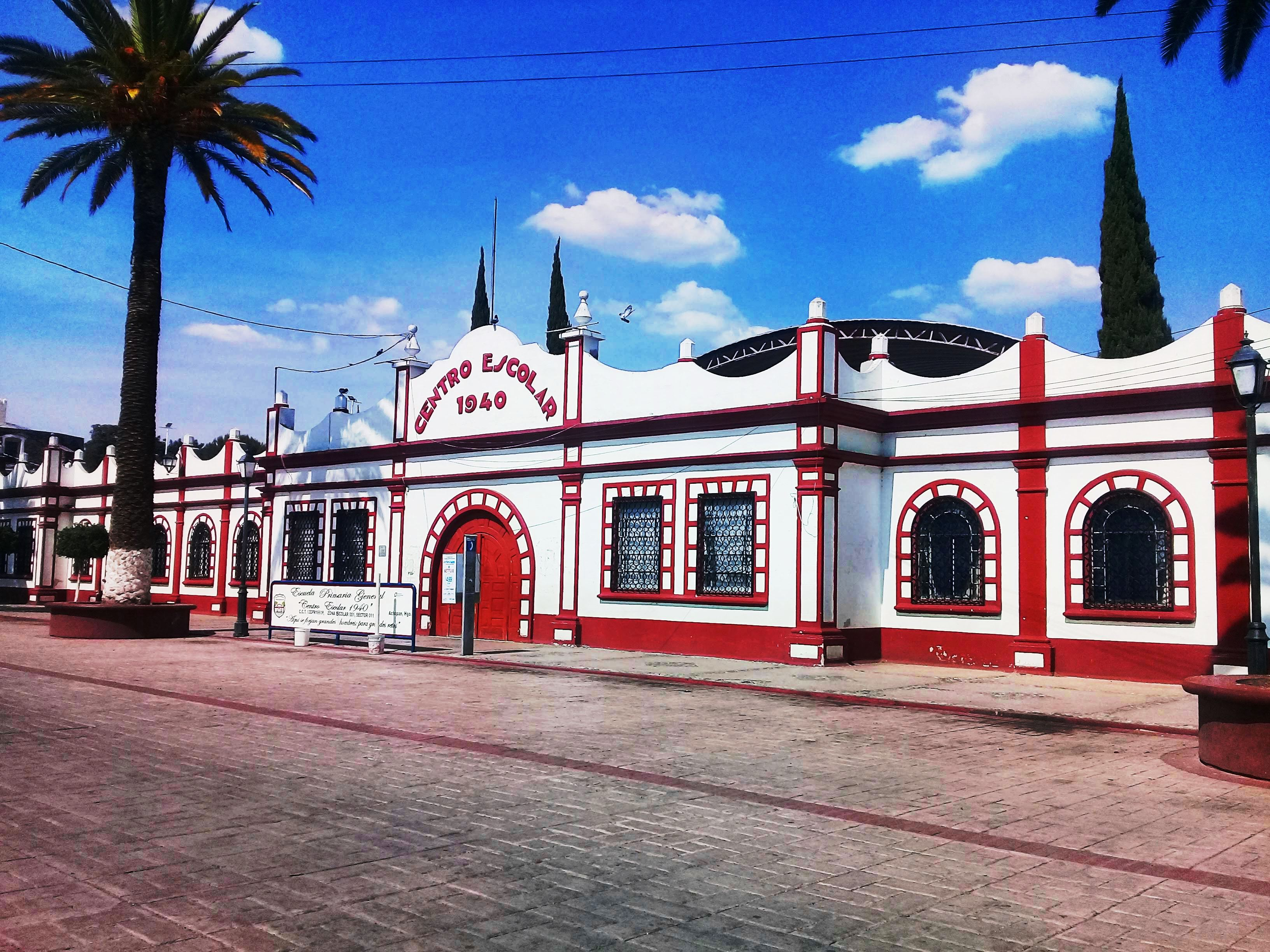
"Escuela Primaria Centro Escolar 1940", one of the first in the region.

In 1928 the Normal Regional of Actopan was established in the convent, a normal school with its annex boarding school; it remained until 1932, year in which it works with the Normal Rural de El Mexe. On June 27, 1933, the complex was managed by the Direction of Colonial Monuments of the Republic; on February 2 of the same year, it had been declared an artistic and historical monument.

On February 2, 1933, the Church and Convent of San Nicolás de Tolentino was declared a National Historic and Artistic Monument. On April 10, 1939, the first stone of the "Escuela Primaria Centro Escolar 1940" was laid, inaugurated on October 8, 1940; it is one of the oldest primary education centers in the region. In 1946 it was given the category of city. It is estimated that in the mid 1950's the small clock tower of the Church and ex-convent of San Nicolás de Tolentino was removed.

On March 12, 1951, the Actopan social sports club asked INAH for the use of the jagüey, which was abandoned; in a letter signed by the president of the club, Federico Hernández, they asked Manuel Toussaint, directly from INAH, to use it as a court, committing himself to its cleaning and care. Several conditions were set: the most important was to take care of the parapet and rebuild the damaged parts of it, as well as to recondition it. Since May 18, 1954, the conditions for sports practice have been in place.

In 1965 the July 8 Market was built. On July 27, 1966, a decree was published in which the Government of Mexico cedes to the Government of the State of Hidalgo, an annex of the property of the convent to build a sports field, and on August 17, 1966, it was published in the Official Journal of the Federation; being the denominated "Jagüey" the ceded annex. On January 27, 1987, an earthquake of 4.1 on the Richter scale was reported; with a depth of 15 km. After the 1990 census, according to statistical data, INEGI, recognizes the towns of Cañada Chica Aviación and Pozo Grande as officially conurbed to the city of Actopan.

=== 21st century ===
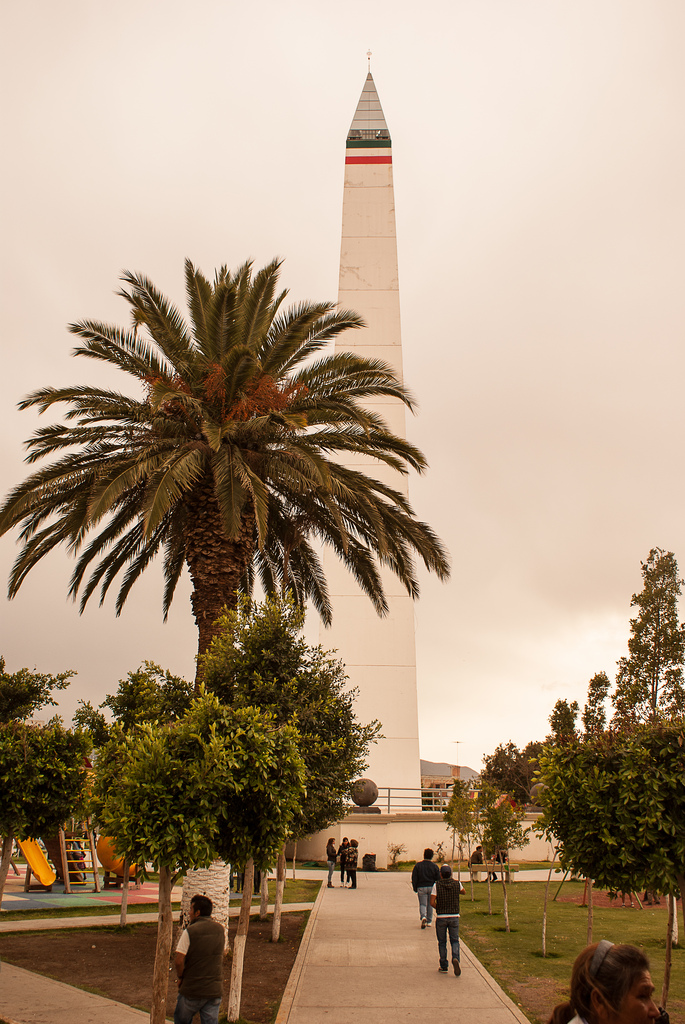
Obelisk of Actopan located in the Reforma Park designed and built to commemorate the Bicentennial of the Independence of Mexico and the Centennial of the Mexican Revolution.

On February 28, 2001, during a tour of Mexico, the Zapatista Army of National Liberation held a rally in the city. On July 8, 2001, the remodeling of Plaza Juárez was inaugurated, maintaining this aspect until today. Between 2005 and 2006 the Terminal de Autotransportes de Actopan was built, and in 2008 part of the Old Municipal Palace was demolished to construct a new building that would house new City Hall offices and the Plaza Constitución. Also in 2008 the Actopan Obelisk was built, located in the Reforma Park, and the Jamaiquitas Market was built.

The Actopan overpass was completed in March 2009. From May 17 to 21, 2010 there were twenty-two earthquakes in the region, with an intensity of between 3.0 and 4.0 on the Richter scale, with their epicenter at an average distance of 13 km north of the city. On June 25, 2012, a makeshift chapel in honor of Jesus Malverde caught fire and it is not known if it was an accident or a possible attack. Between 2013 and 2015 the remodeling of the July 8 Market took place. Between April 23 and 24, 2016 the north wall of what was the old municipal palace was demolished.

On December 30, 2016, close to 500 merchants held a caravan in the center of the city in protest of the increase in gasoline prices. On January 4, 2017, after different protests, both directions of the Mexico-Laredo federal highway were closed, in front of the truck station. Different stores such as Aurrerá, Comercial Mexicana and OXXO were looted; while the tianguis, which is set up on Wednesdays, did not operate completely and different stores remained closed. Of the five gas stations in the city, two were looted by different groups of people who gave away gasoline.

The September 7 earthquake in Chiapas and the September 19 earthquake in Puebla were felt in the city, and in general terms there was no serious structural damage. The earthquake of greatest intensity recorded during 2018 in Hidalgo, occurred on March 20 at 04:06 p. m. in the municipality of Actopan, with 3.9 degrees on the Richter scale. On May 30, 2018, about 15 ha, located in the Buenos Aires neighborhood, were consumed by a fire.

On May 18, 2018, a construction company located in the Centro neighborhood was robbed; an operation was implemented to search for the vehicle, and a chase was initiated in El Arenal. It was at the junction of the highway with Tolcayuca and Villa de Tezontepec, where it collided with a bus; resulting in two dead and seven detainees. On September 7, 2019, a shooting occurred when elements of the Public Security of Hidalgo stopped a robbery, it happened on the highway at the height of the overpass. On March 30, 2020, two people were gunned down on Churubusco Street, on the corner of 2 de Abril, one block from the Obelisco de Actopan.

On March 19, different public spaces were closed due to the health emergency caused by the COVID-19 pandemic. On April 20, 2020, it was reported that the Wednesday tianguis, scheduled for April 22, 2020, was suspended. On April 26, 2020, the first case of COVID-19 was announced in Actopan. (Note: The difference between the data provided by the General Directorate of Epidemiology (DGE), which at that time reported 2 cases, is due to the fact that the federal agency includes people from Hidalgo who receive medical attention in other parts of the country.) As of April 30, access to vehicles was restricted to the center of the city and a sanitary fence was placed. The Actopan City Hall informed the temporary suspension of the Wednesday and Sunday tianguis, as of May 6; as of May 13, the Wednesday tianguis agreed to be temporarily relocated to the side of the Actopan-La Estancia highway. On May 11, 2020, the COVID-19 Actopan Immediate Response Hospital, which was built in 15 days, was inaugurated. On May 14, the first death was reported in Actopan.

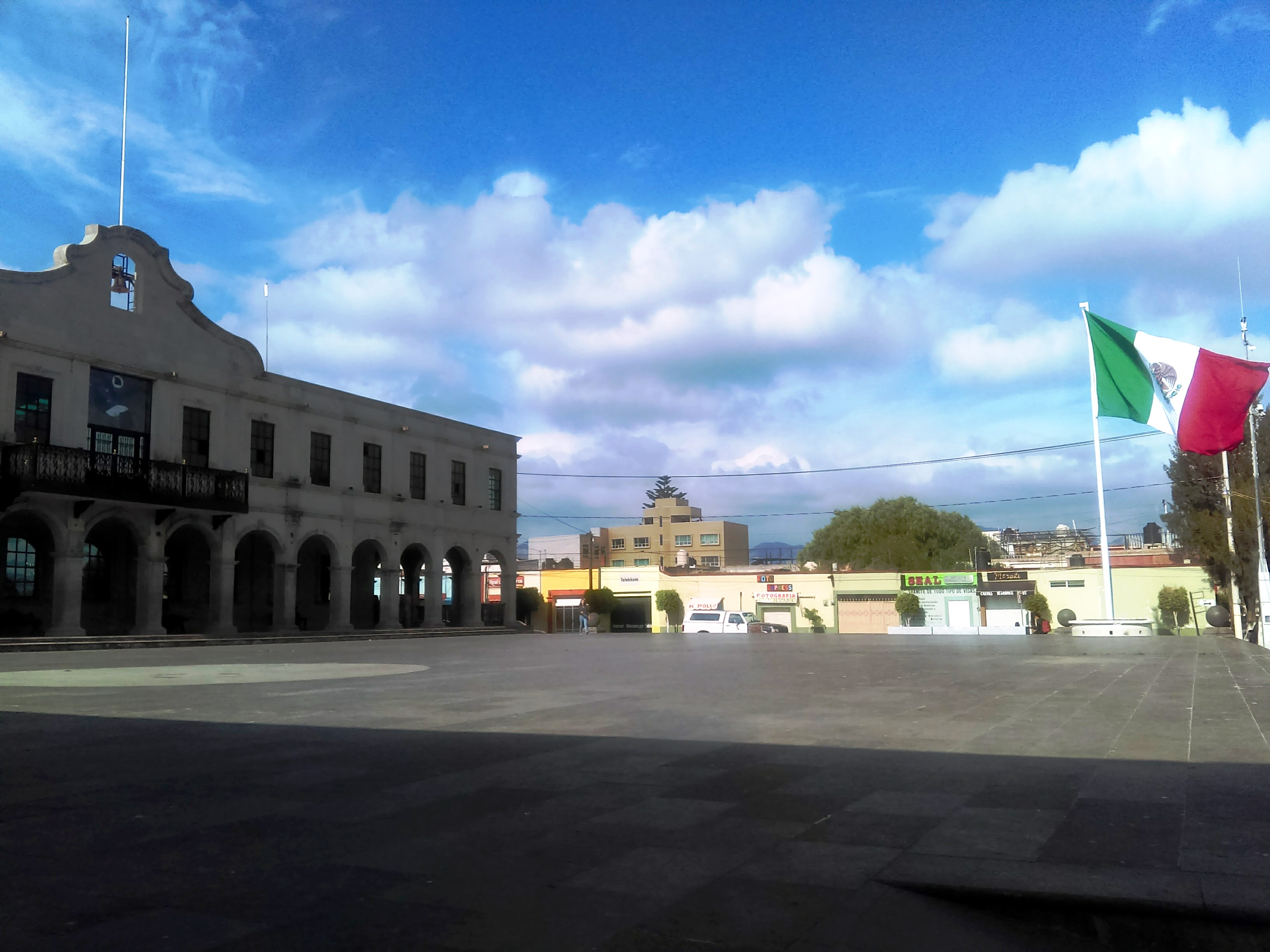
Plaza Constitución.

On June 14, the Sunday tianguis was reinstalled, and on June 17, the Wednesday tianguis was reinstalled in the center of the city. On June 23 it was announced that the Barbacoa Fair held in the city was suspended. The patronal feast of San Nicolás de Tolentino was also cancelled. On September 25, 2020, the circulation of vehicles in the downtown area of Actopan was resumed.

Faced with an increase in COVID-19 infections, as of February 1, 2021; the Actopan City Hall decided to restrict vehicle access to the city center, placed a sanitary fence, closed the Municipal Presidency, and suspended the city's tianguis. By March 2021, circulation in the city center was reopened; and by mid-July, Plaza Juarez was reopened; on March 13, 2022, Parque La Reforma was reopened.

== Geography ==
=== Location ===
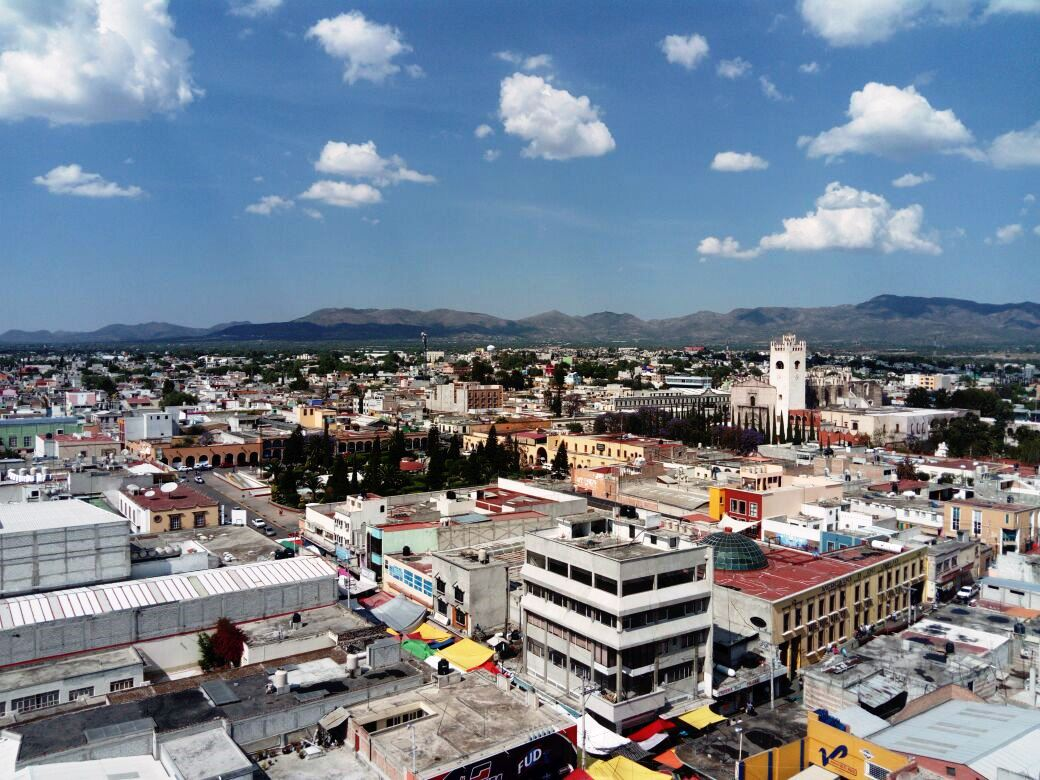
Panoramics in Actopan.

Its geographical coordinates are 20° 16' 05" north latitude and 98° 56' 39" west longitude. It is located north of Mexico City, from which it is 125 km away, and only 37 km northwest of Pachuca de Soto.

The city is bordered on the north by Cañada Chica Antigua and Dajiedhi; on the northeast by La Estancia and San Diego Canguihuindo; on the east by La Peña and La Loma; on the southeast by El Jiadi and El Arenal; on the south by Bothi Baji, El Palomo and El Huaxtho; on the southwest by El Boxtha and on the west by El Daxthá.

It is located in the geographic region of the state of Hidalgo called Mezquital Valley. The town is located in the eastern region of Mexico, in the center of the state of Hidalgo and in the center of the municipal territory of Actopan.

=== Relief and hydrography ===
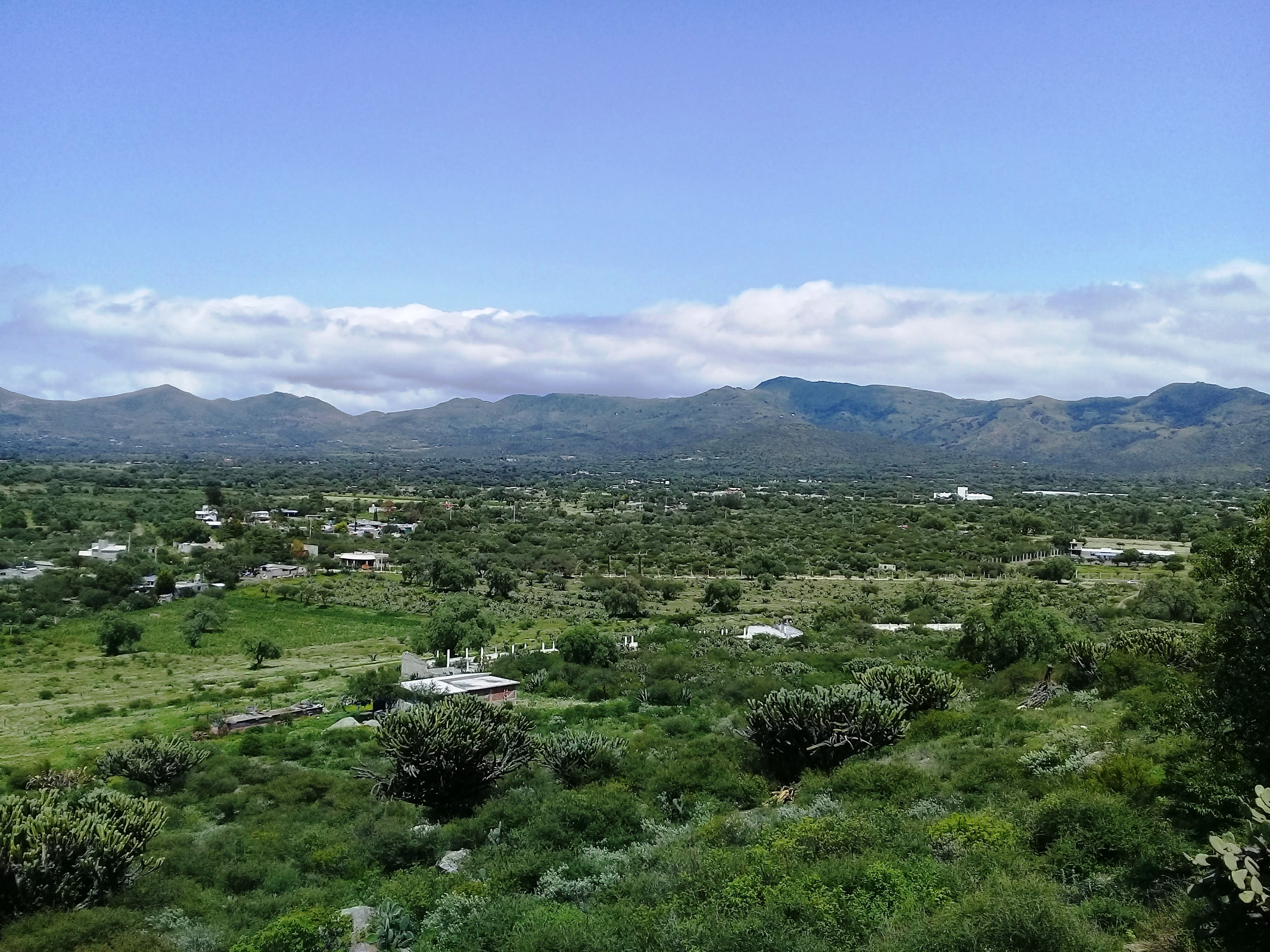
Actopan Valley belonging to the Mezquital Valley, the Sierra de Actopan belonging to the Sierra Madre Oriental can be seen.

The city has an average altitude of 2001 meters above sea level; with a relief mainly of plains; with a terrain slope of 0 to 3 degrees. Physiographically it is located in the province of the Trans-Mexican Volcanic Belt, within the subprovince of Plains and Sierras of Querétaro and Hidalgo. To the north and northeast of the city, a little more than 2 km from the town of La Estancia, is the northern border between the Trans-Mexican Volcanic Belt and the Sierra Madre Oriental; therefore, there are faults in the region, causing seismic activity.

In terms of edaphology, it has a phaeozem and alluvial soil type; in terms of geology it has extrusive igneous rocks such as andesite, intermediate volcanic breccia and volcanoclastic. Regarding hydrography, the city is located in the Pánuco region, within the basin of the Moctezuma River, in the sub-basin of the Actopan River. The city is also located on the Actopan-Santiago de Anaya aquifer.

=== Climate ===
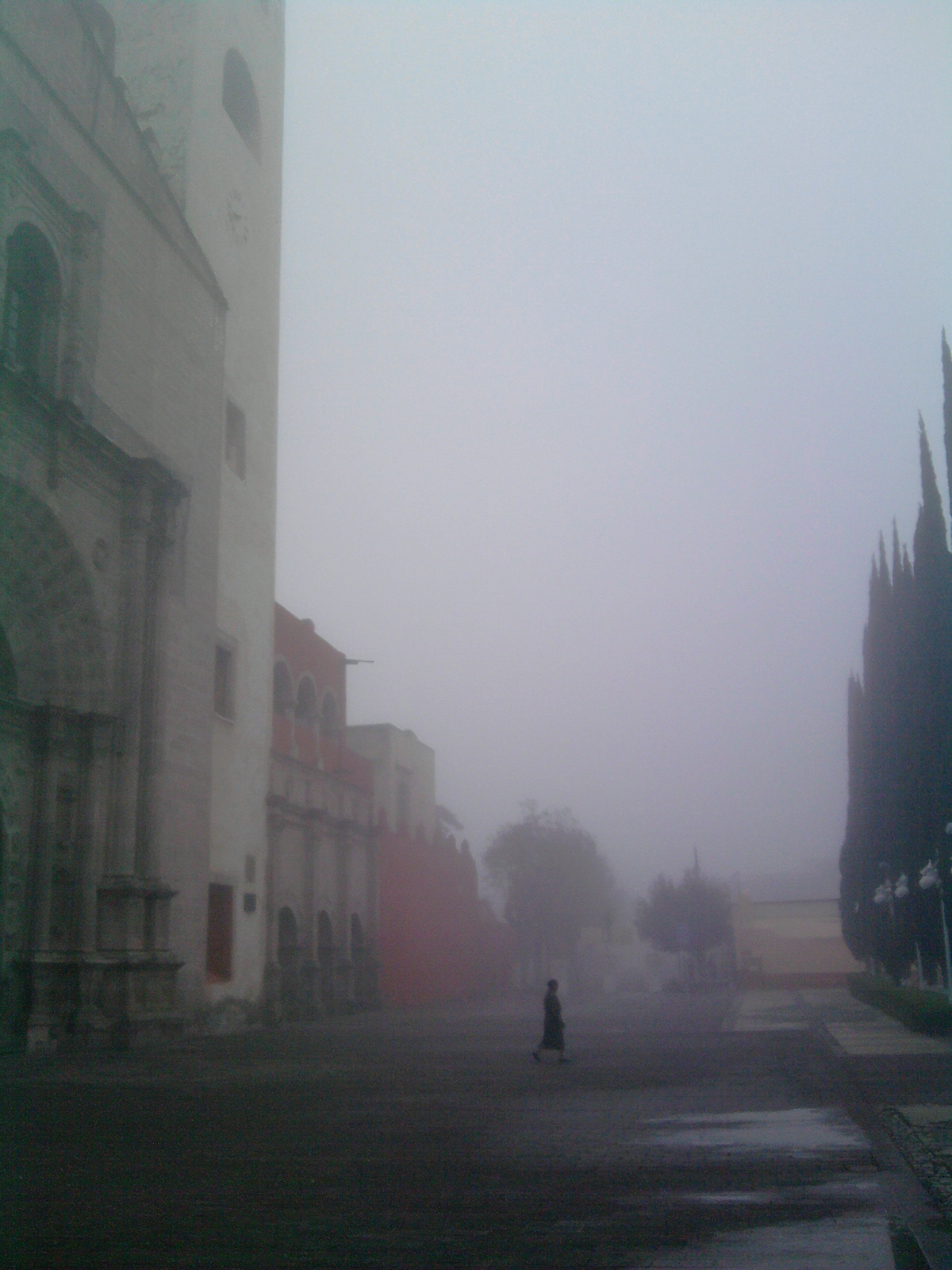
Misty morning in Actopan.

The city has a semi-dry temperate climate; the average monthly temperature ranges from 13 °C in December and January, which are the coldest months of the year, to 20 °C in May, which has the highest temperatures. The city's meteorological station has estimated that the average annual temperature is approximately 16.4 °C. In regard to rainfall, the average level observed is around 400 mm, with June and September being the months of highest rainfall and February and December the months of lowest rainfall.

=== Flora and fauna ===
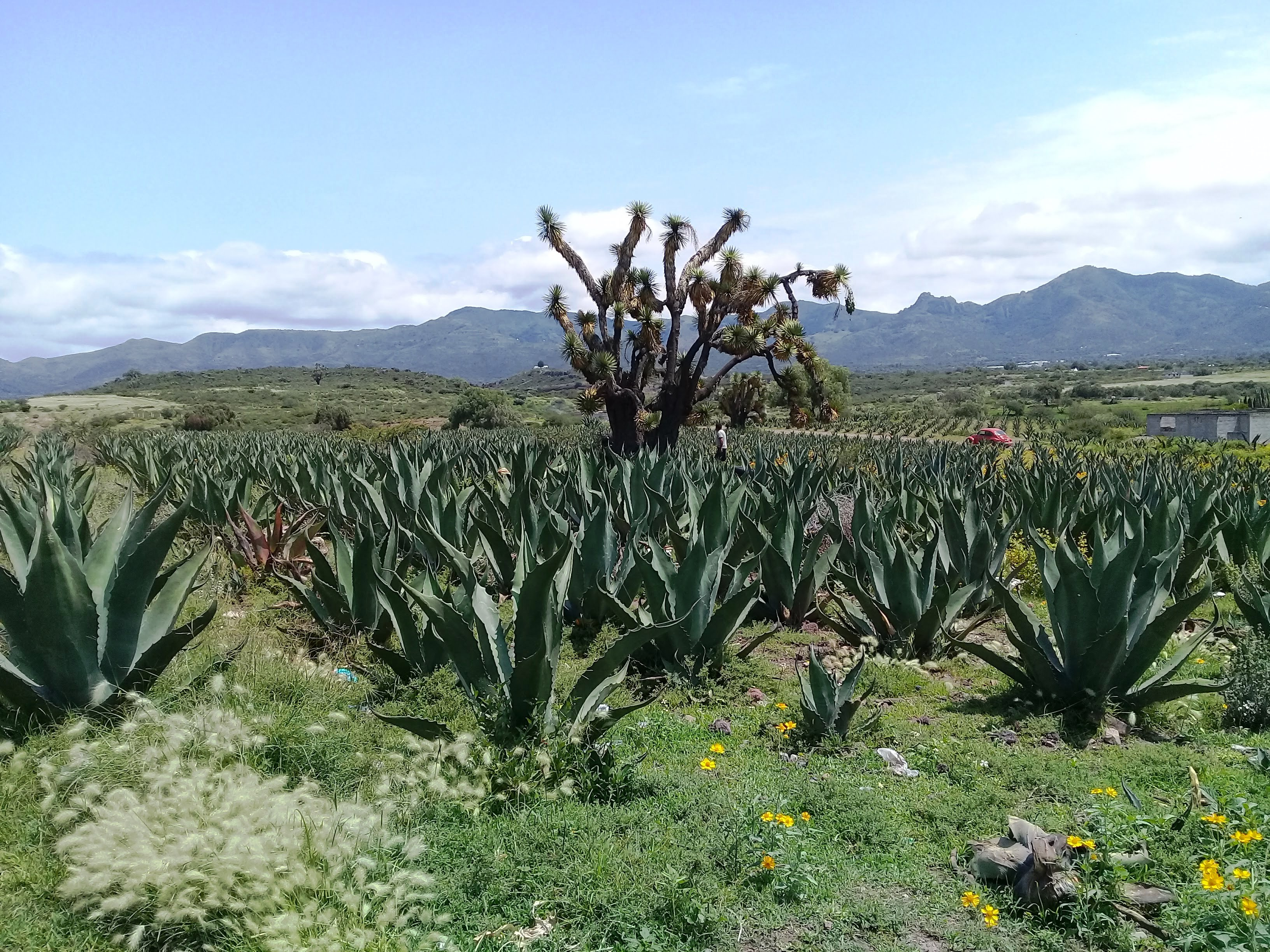
Maguey plantation on the outskirts of the city.

Actopan is located in the Sierra Madre Oriental and southern Serranías floristic provinces within the Mesoamerican Mountain region. Most of its vegetation is made up of unarmed and thorny scrublands, grasslands, maguey, nances, opuntia stricta, mesquites, acacias, bilberry cacti, pitayas, chollas, alicoches and echinocactus. The fauna in this region includes rabbits, squirrels, opossums, scorpions, lizards, spiders, centipedes, crickets, grasshoppers, ants and pinacate beetles.

About 14 km from the city is the Actopan Wildlife Corridor, located in Mesa Chica and Los Ejidos El Saucillo, Las Mecas and Santa María Magdalena; with an area of 9267.38 ha. The area was declared a state wildlife corridor on June 27, 2020. On June 28, 2017, the Secretary of the Environment and Natural Resources of Hidalgo (Semanath) confirmed the presence of pumas in this area after residents of the region reported several attacks on livestock and sightings of the animal.

== Politics ==
=== City Hall ===
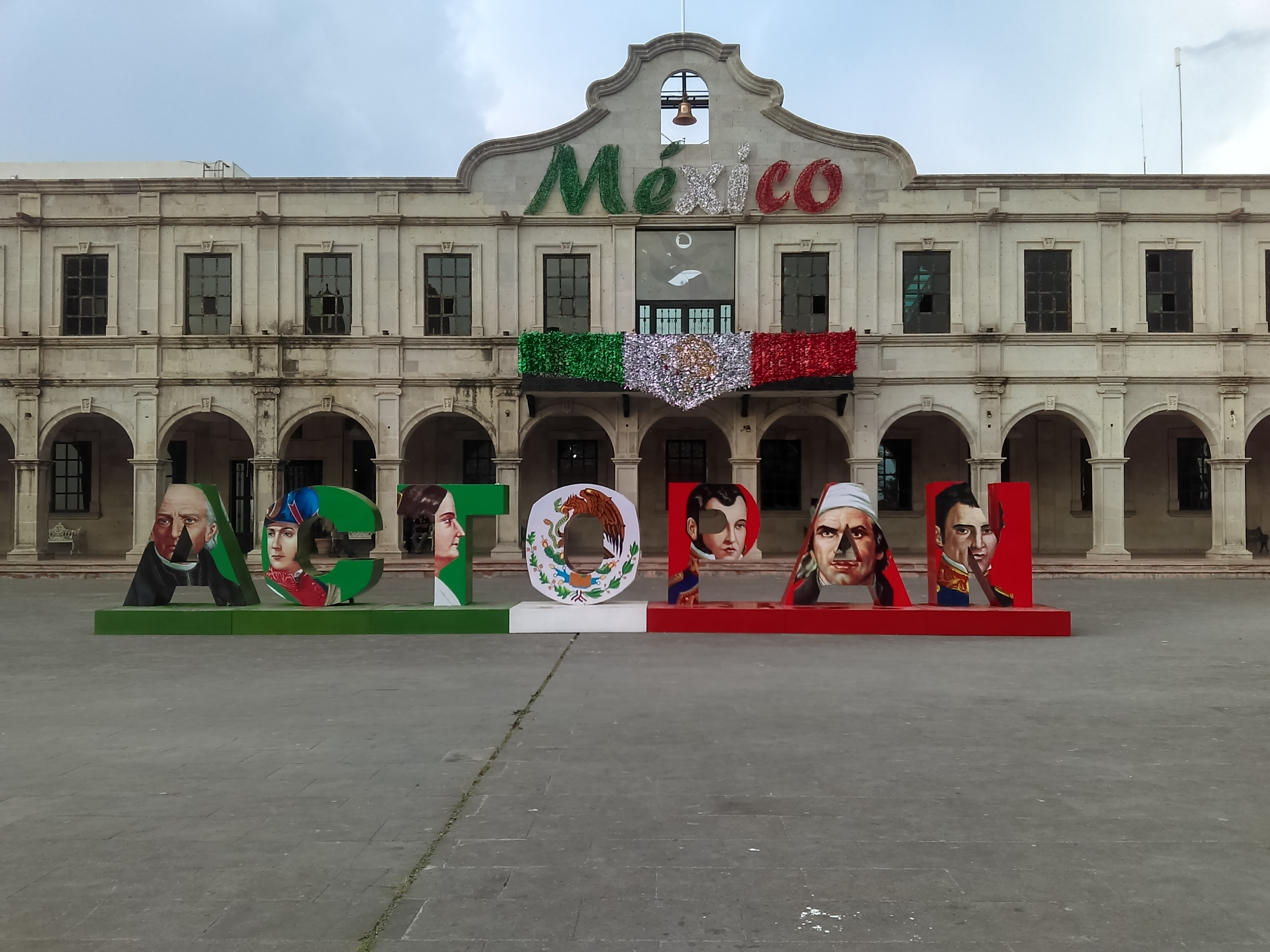
Actopan's Municipal Palace decorated for the national holidays.

The Actopan City Hall was established on August 6, 1824; and is formed by a Municipal President, a Síndico Procurador, eleven councillors and twenty-four Municipal Delegates. By constitutional mandate, every city council has the power to elaborate bylaws that regulate its internal functioning and community life. The City Council is in charge of the government of the municipality of Actopan, which is integrated by the city and forty other localities.

The municipality is bordered to the north by the municipalities of Santiago de Anaya and Metztitlán; to the east by the municipalities of Metztitlán, Atotonilco El Grande, Mineral del Chico and El Arenal; to the south by the municipalities of El Arenal, San Agustín Tlaxiaca and Ajacuba; to the west by the municipalities of Ajacuba, San Salvador and Santiago de Anaya.

=== Districts and regions ===
The city is the seat of the III Federal Electoral District of Hidalgo for the election of federal deputies to the Chamber of Deputies of Mexico; and of the VIII Local Electoral District of Hidalgo for the election of local deputies to the Congress of Hidalgo. According to the Instituto Nacional Electoral (INE) the city is integrated by fourteen electoral sections, from 0034 to 0047. At the state administrative regional level, Hidalgo belongs to Macroregion V and Microregion VII, and is also the headquarters of Operational Region XI Actopan. This administrative region of Hidalgo allows bringing government programs and actions closer to the local population. On the other hand, it belongs to the I Judicial District of Hidalgo, where judicial procedures of the Judicial Power of the State of Hidalgo are settled.

=== Twinning ===
On April 23, 2022, the Actopan City Hall received members and authorities of the Actopan, Veracruz City Hall; in a meeting, both municipalities signed a twinning agreement. On May 25, 2022, the twinning was ratified with the unveiling of a plaque in a ceremony held in the esplanade of Morelos Park in Actopan, Veracruz. On July 4, 2022, the twinning was signed between the city and Águas de São Pedro, Brazil.

== Demographics ==
=== Population dynamics ===
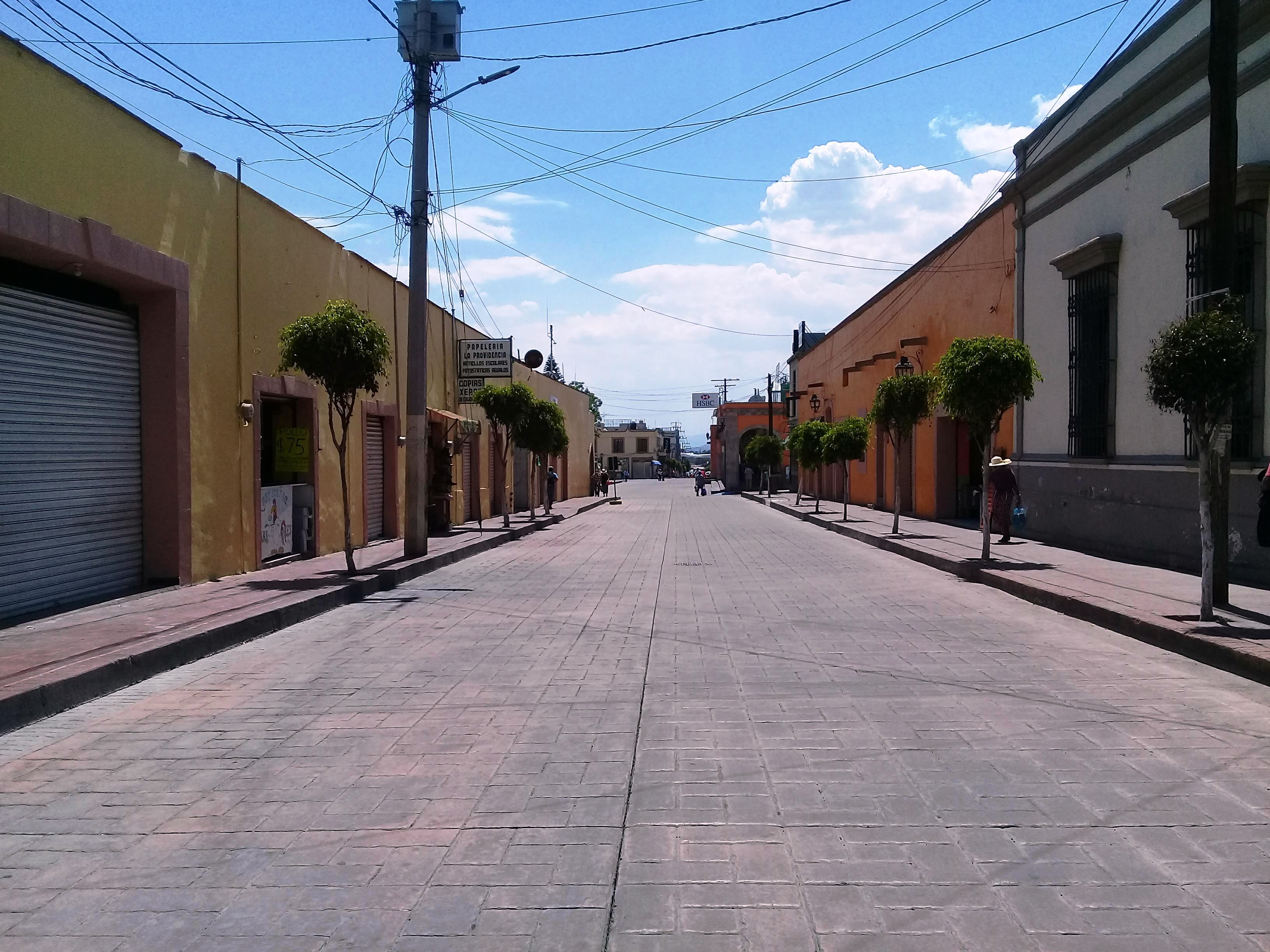
Street of Actopan.

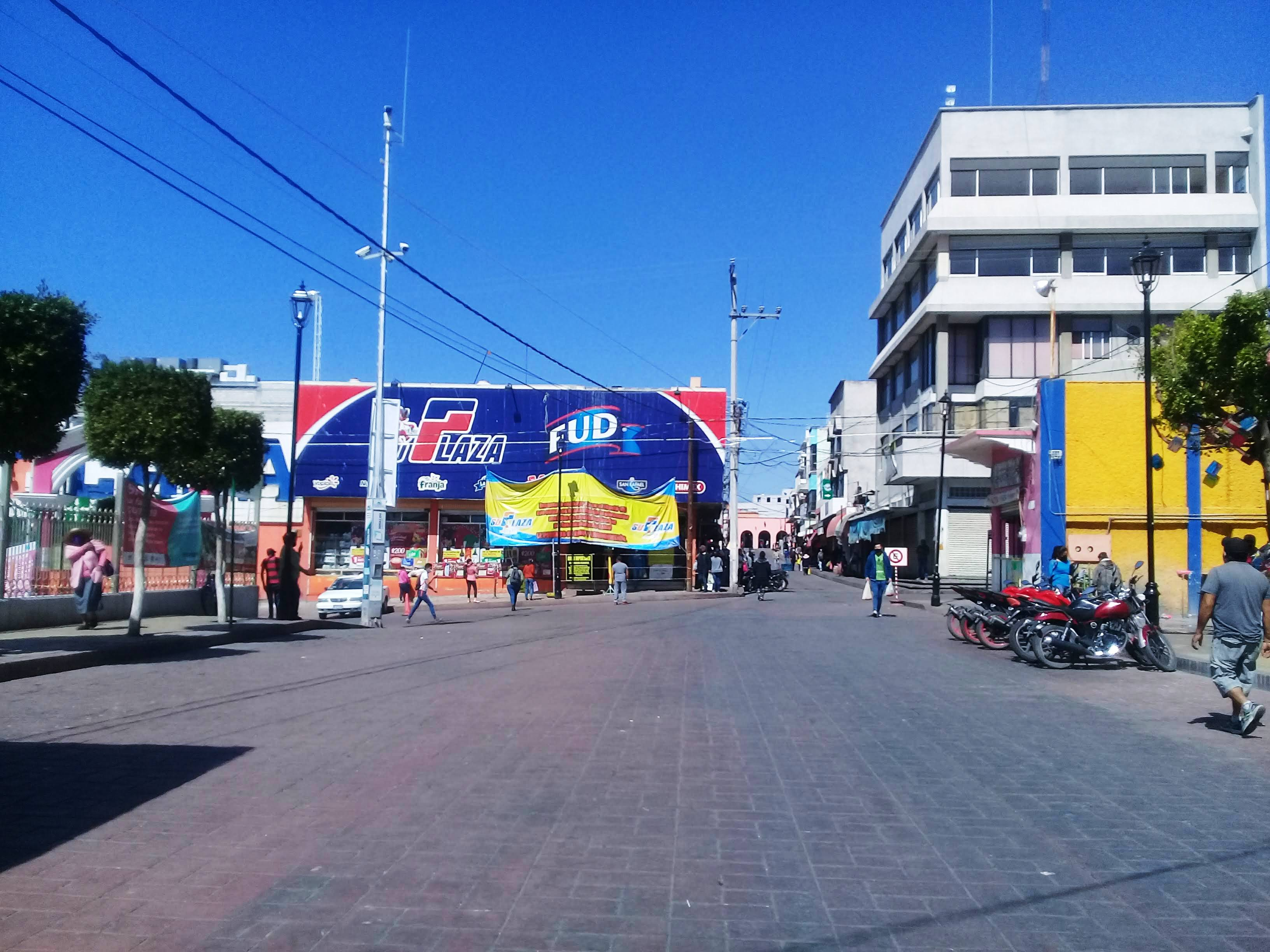
Street of Actopan.

According to the results of the 2020 Population and Housing Census conducted by the National Institute of Statistics and Geography (INEGI), the town has 32,276 inhabitants; the town's population represents 52.91% of the municipal population. Of the population 15 262 are men, which represents 47.29% of the population and 17 014 are women, which represents 52.71% of the population. It occupies the seventh place in the count of localities in the state of Hidalgo.

The most extensive and representative indigenous people in the city are the Otomí people; as of 2020 there are 653 people who speak an indigenous language. Of which the majority speak the Otomí language, especially the Otomí variant of the Mezquital Valley, which is also referred to by its own speakers as hñähñú, ñänhú, ñandú, ñóhnño or ñanhmu. (Note: Size of the linguistic community according to the number of speakers for the population aged 3 years and older.) There are 298 people in the city who call themselves Afro-Mexicans or Afro-descendants.

The main religion is Catholic; by 2020, about 25,544 people declare themselves Catholic; the city belongs to the Archdiocese of Tulancingo and the patron saint is Nicolás de Tolentino. By 2020, about 3,426 people declare themselves Protestant or Evangelical Christians including The Church of Jesus Christ of Latter-day Saints, La Luz del Mundo Church and Jehovah's Witnesses. About 3,188 people declared to be atheists, agnostics, or to have no religion or not to be ascribed to any religion; and only 64 declared other beliefs or different spiritual preferences.

demographics vertical bar chart of between 1900 and 2020
Population from the censuses and counts of the National Institute of Statistics and Geography (INEGI) from 1900 to 2020.

=== Housing and urban planning ===
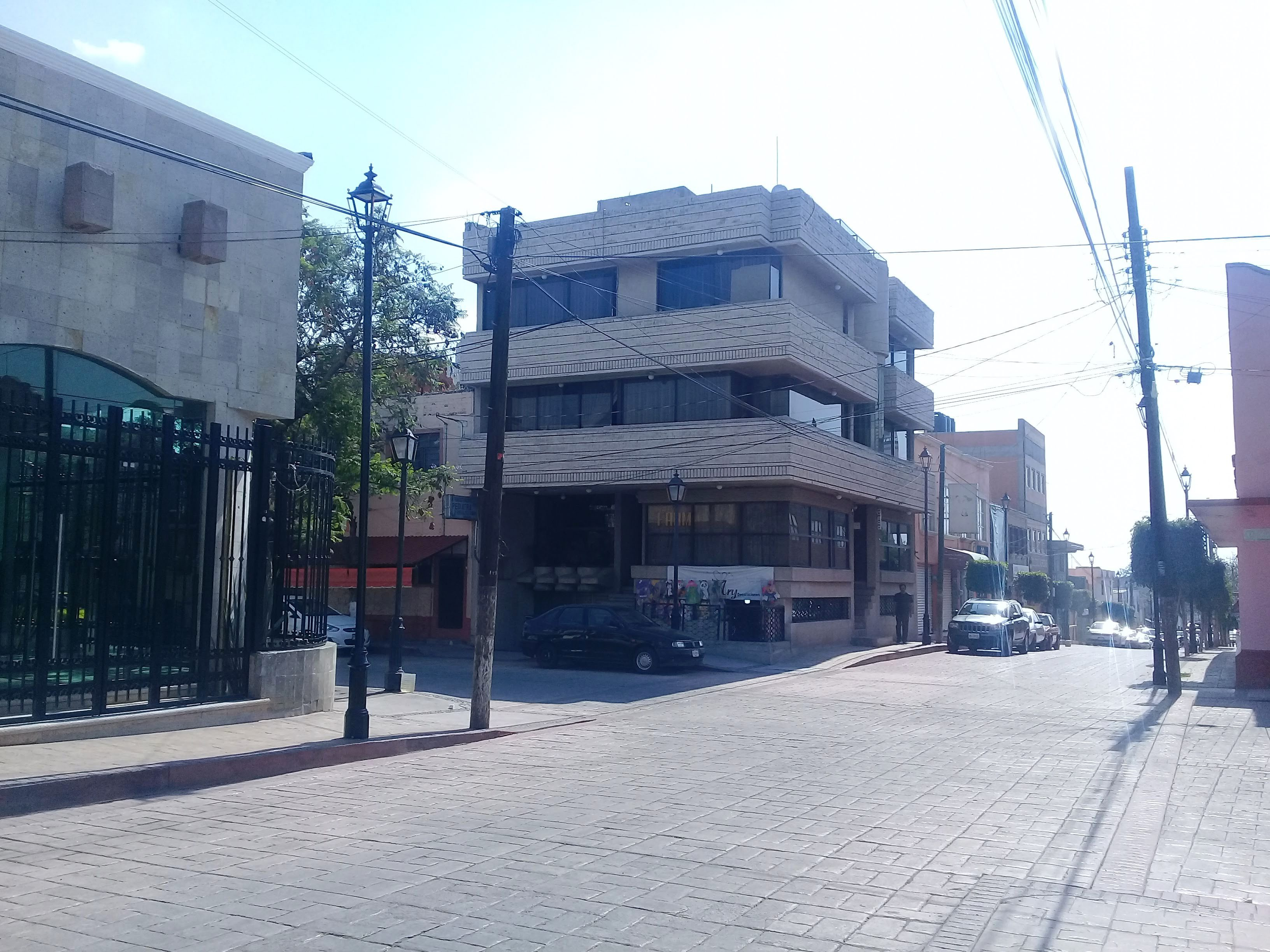
Buildings in Actopan.

According to the Actopan City Hall, the neighborhoods that make up the city are: Aviación, Benito Juárez, Chapultepec, Centro Norte, Centro Sur, Deportivo Olímpico, Dos Cerritos, Efrén Rebolledo (Parque Urbano), El Cerrito, El Porvenir, Eulalio Ángeles, Fundición Alta, Fundición Baja, Guzmán Mayer, Guadalupe, Jesús Luz Meneses, La Estación, La Floresta, La Hacienda, Las Monjas, Los Frailes, Los Olivos, Niños Héroes, Nuevo Actopan, Obrera, Rojo Gómez, Tierra y Libertad, and Unidad Deportiva.

According to INEGI, Cañada Chica, Cañada Aviación, and Pozo Grande, are also part of the city, while El Porvenir and Dos Cerritos are considered separate localities; this is due to the differences in the definition between the demographic and political spheres of both entities.

According to the results presented by the General Population and Housing Census 2020, the city has a total of 10,946 homes; of which 8687 are inhabited, 1,571 are uninhabited and 688 are for temporary use; with an average of 3.71 people per home. The construction of the houses in Actopan is made of blocks, brick or prefabricated materials, their roofs are cast, there is even decoration with marble, sett and a great variety of other materials; however, in some cases their construction is based on adobe, the walls are made of brick and the roofs are made of resistant sheet metal or petatillo.

=== Poverty and social exclusion ===
In 2010, it registered a very low degree of social exclusion, in contrast to the municipality, which has a low degree. In 2010, the city registered a social backwardness index of −1.34455. In 2015 the municipality of Actopan ranked 21st out of 84 municipalities on the state scale of social backwardness. The homes with dirt floors are 255 which represents 3.50%; in terms of public services the homes without drainage are 59 which represents 0.81%; those without electricity are 53 homes (0.73%); without piped water are 152 homes (2.09%); without sanitation are 83 homes (1.14%).

== Culture ==
=== Architecture ===
==== Buildings ====
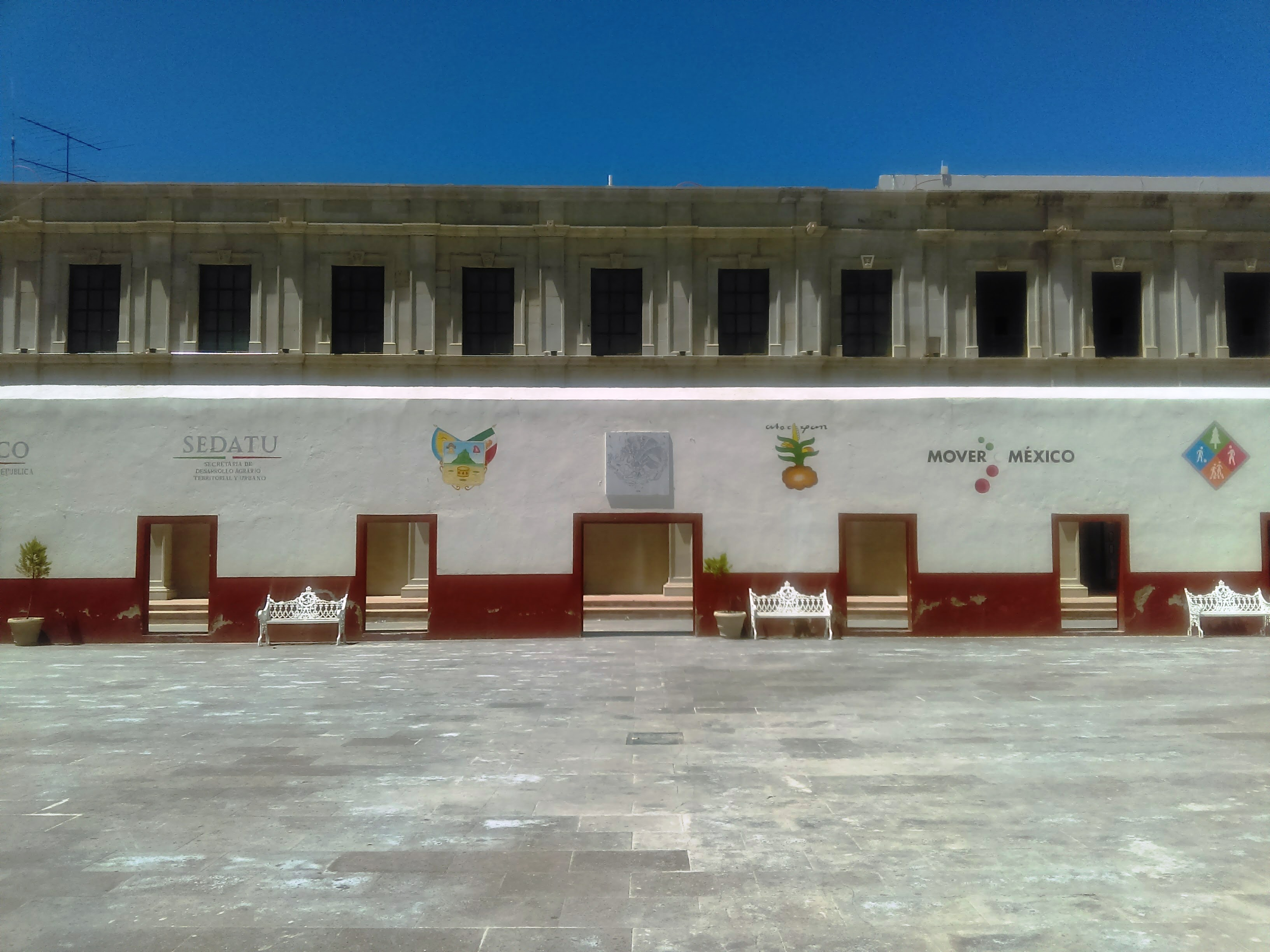
Plaza de las Artes in the old Municipal Palace.

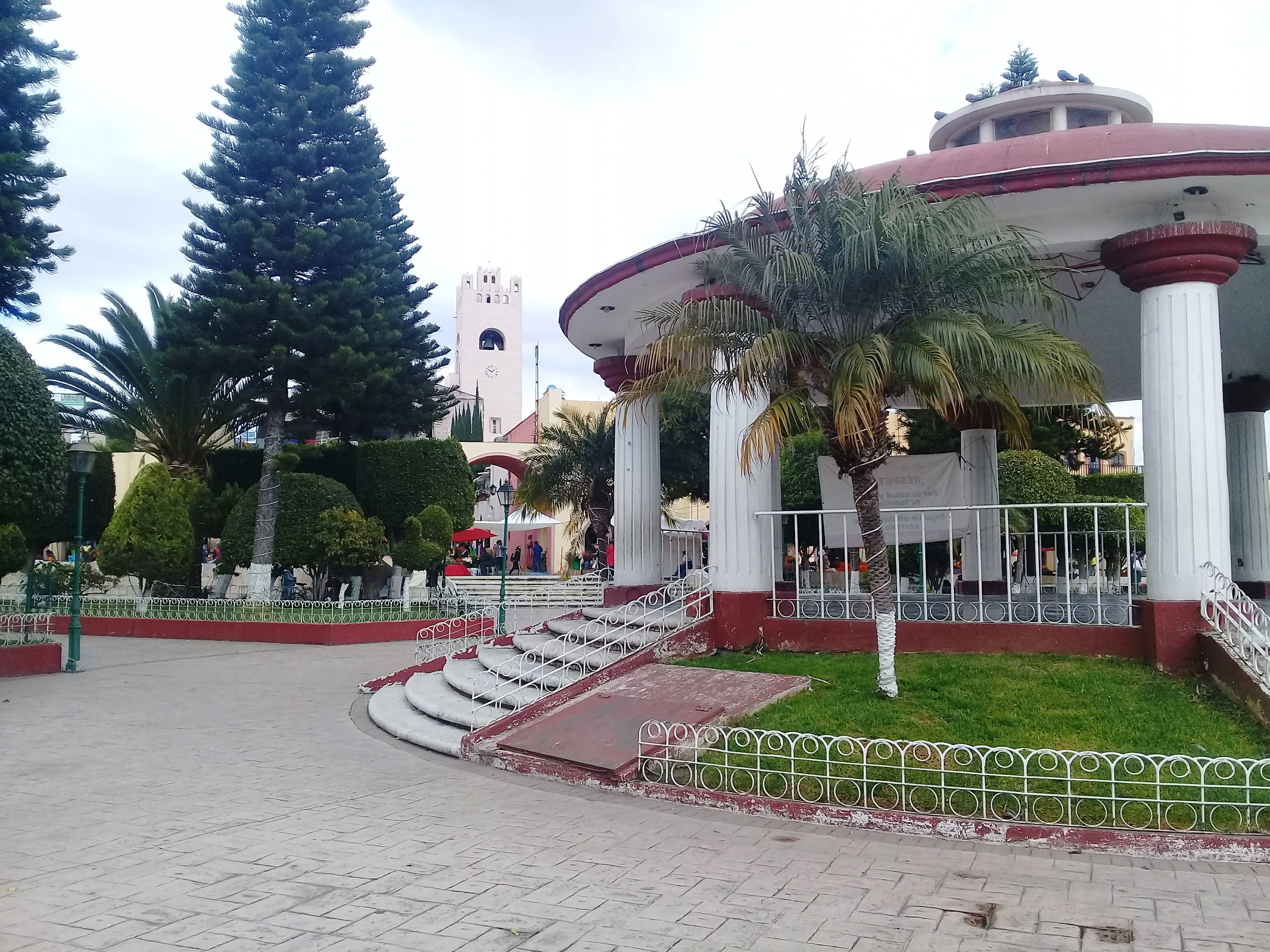
Plaza Juarez in the center of the city.

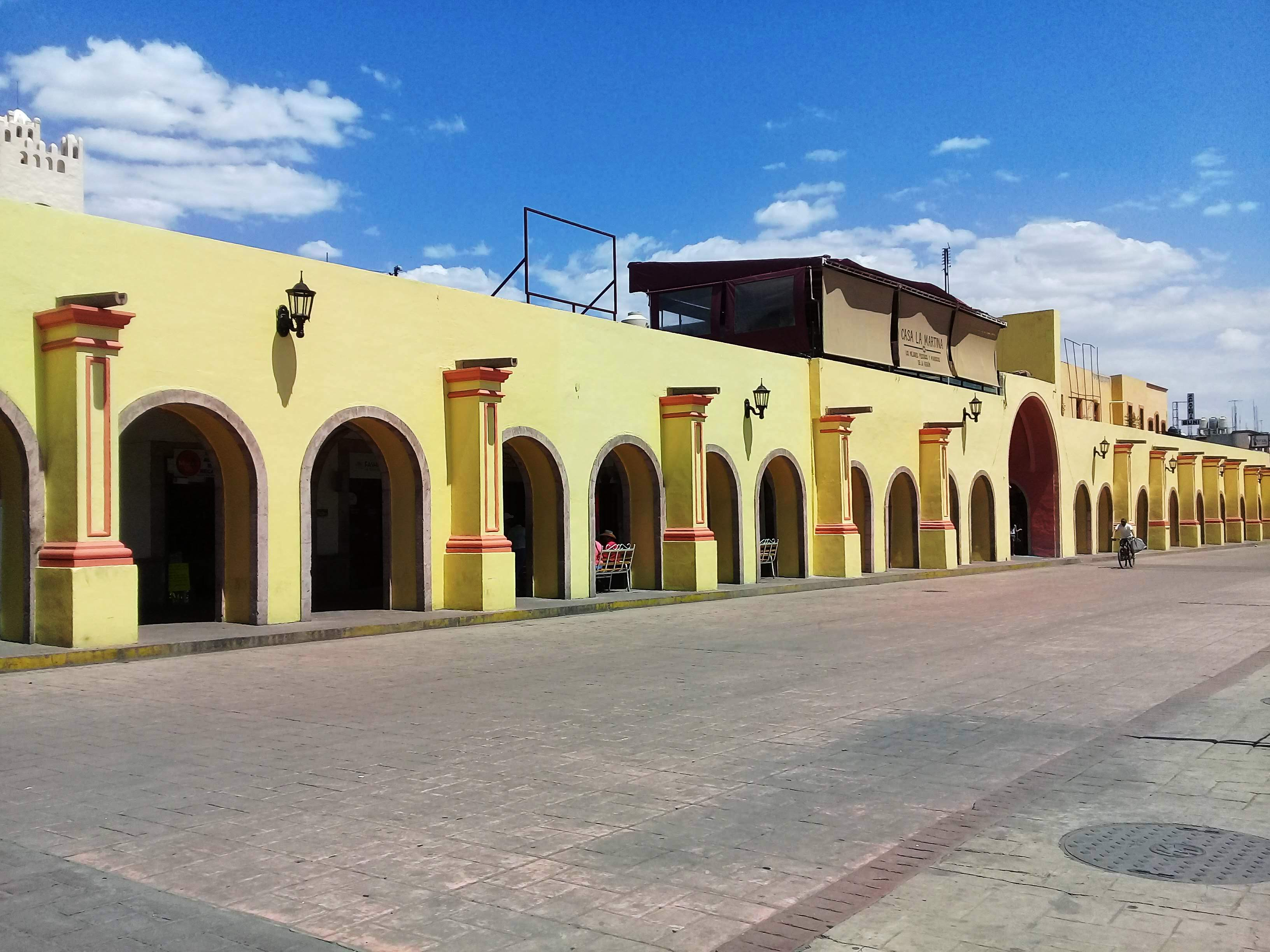
Soportal of Plaza Juárez.

The so-called "city center" consists of an area containing the oldest and most important buildings in the city and includes the following four plazas and parks: Plaza Juárez, which is located in front of the ex-convent; Plaza de la Constitución, in front of the Palacio Municipal; Parque Reforma, which houses the obelisk; and Parque del Salto, located in an old aqueduct pond.

The Church and ex-convent of San Nicolás de Tolentino is, from the architectural and pictorial point of view, one of the greatest examples of the Novo-Hispanic art of the 16th century. This convent shows a combination of architectural styles such as Plateresque, Mudejar, Gothic, Romanesque and Renaissance. It has a unique example of an open chapel 17.5 m wide and 12 m high, entirely covered with fresco murals.

The Actopan Obelisk is located in the Reforma Park; around 2008 it was built, but it was not until 2009 when it was inaugurated. It consists of an elongated quadrangular column mounted on a small base slightly with a larger dimension of the obelisk, whose sides are reduced until reaching the top, ending in the pyramidal tip called pyramidion. Its total height is 57 meters, inside there is a staircase that leads to the top and is used as a viewpoint.

The Actopan Municipal Palace is a two-story building, with a style reminiscent of neoclassical architecture; it has a soportal with horseshoe arches, with the relief of the Actopan glyph in the keystone; the pilasters with Ionic capitals continue to support a smooth entablature that leads to the second level. In the second level there is a series of square windows; with a stained glass window and balcony in the central part. The entire complex is topped by a continuous parapet and a mixtilinear pediment in the central part. This was built in 2008, when the auditorium of the Old Municipal Palace was demolished.

The Old Municipal Palace is a rectangular building of a single floor; the access is a large opening with a rebated arch, with pilasters on the sides, which support a triangular frontispiece, the pilasters in the upper section are transformed into corbels in the form of volutes. All crowned by a mixtilinear pediment with a niche. In 2008 the auditorium was demolished and in 2016 the north section; inside the patio is called Plaza de las Artes.

==== Monuments ====
There are two monuments located in Plaza Juarez, one dedicated to Miguel Hidalgo and the other to Benito Juarez. The Monument to Miguel Hidalgo is a statue of the personage on a hexagonal base, which in turn is on a cylindrical pedestal. The Monument to Benito Juarez placed in 1977, is a bust of the personage on a cylindrical pedestal. Another monument in the city is the monument to Efren Rebolledo, located next to the Efren Rebolledo Elementary School. There is also a monument to Jesús Luz Meneses, located at the intersection of María del Carmen González and Corregidora Streets, built in the 1990s in honor of the works carried out in the area.

Among the architectural remains of the city's aqueduct are the "Fuente de Mendoza" and "Fuente El Salto". The Mendoza Fountain has an elongated hexagonal floor plan, three of its sides form a curbstone. The El Salto Fountain is located on an old pond, located in the Nicolás Romero Garden; in 2014 it underwent a remodeling giving it its current appearance. On September 13, 2004, the Monument to the Niños Héroes was inaugurated; it consists of a semi-circular wall with six columns each representing the six Mexican cadets, with a commemorative plaque in the center.

On June 21, 2019, the Monument to the Teacher was inaugurated, for the design of the monument a call was issued, where the citizenship participated. This monument consists of a semicircular base, where five doric columns rise; in the center on a pedestal is the sculpture of two hands holding books, and a plaque that says "thank you". In Colonia Guzmán Mayer there is a monument to Genaro Guzmán Mayer.

Actopan monuments

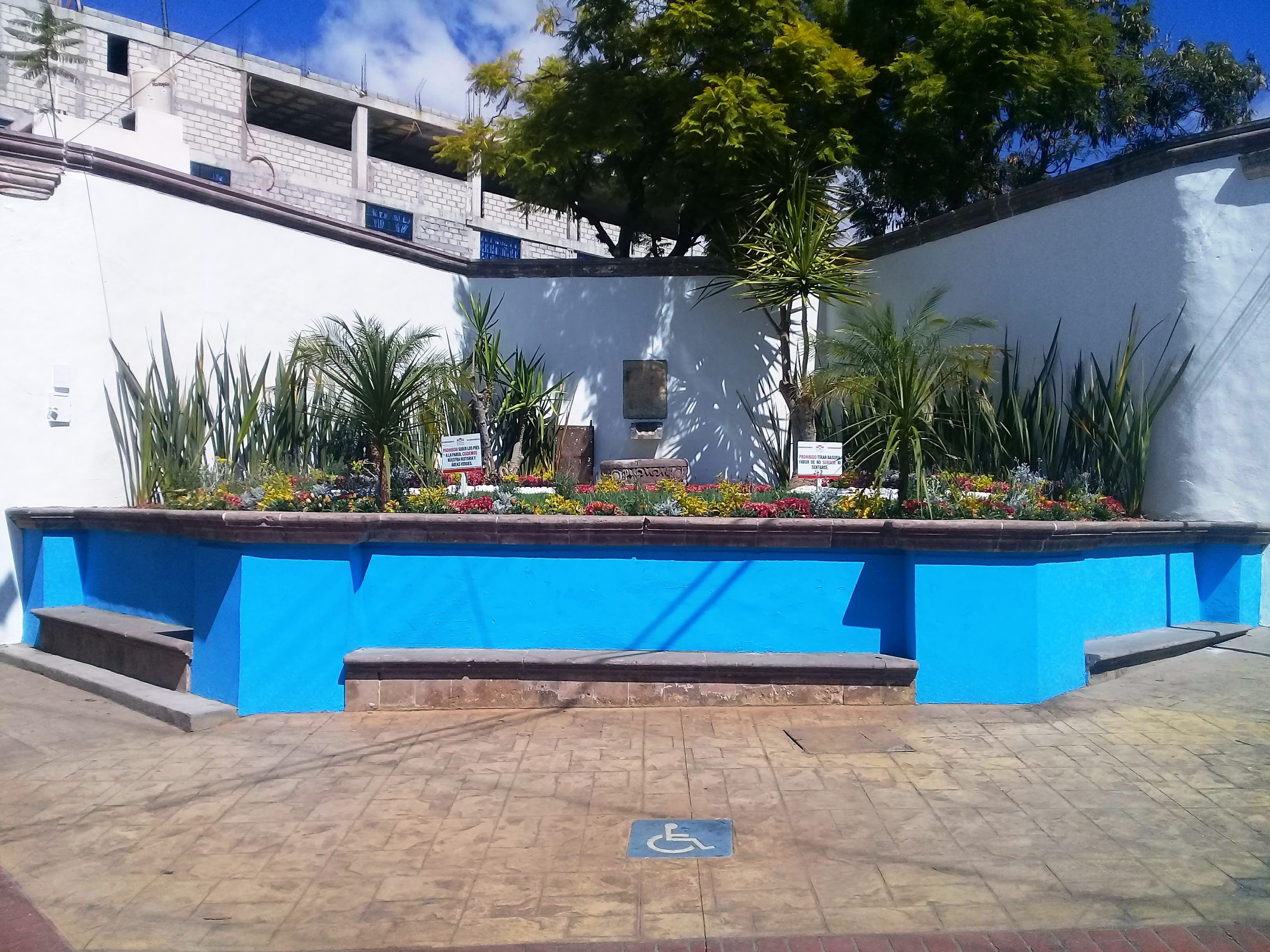
Mendoza Fountain.

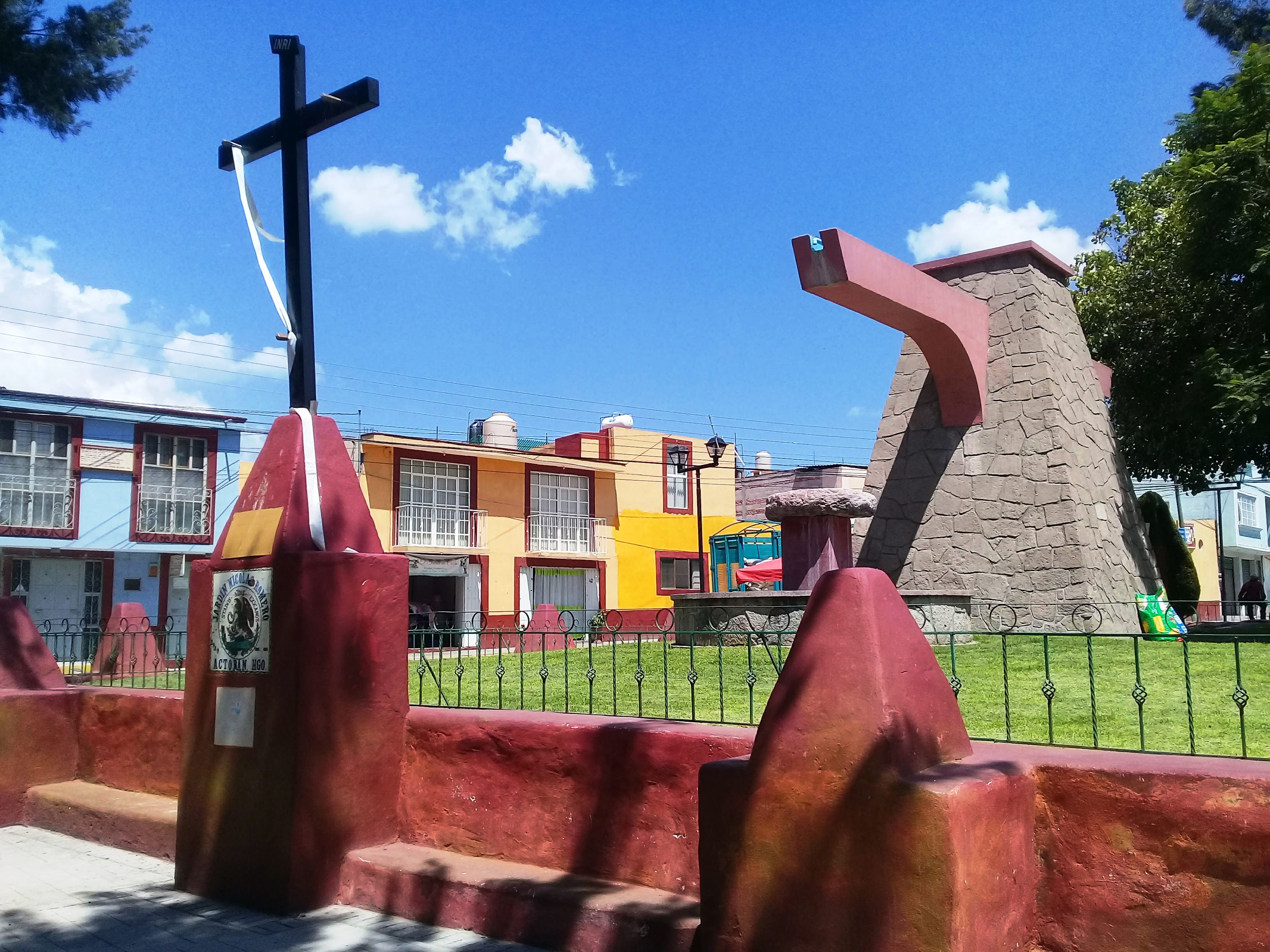
El Salto fountain

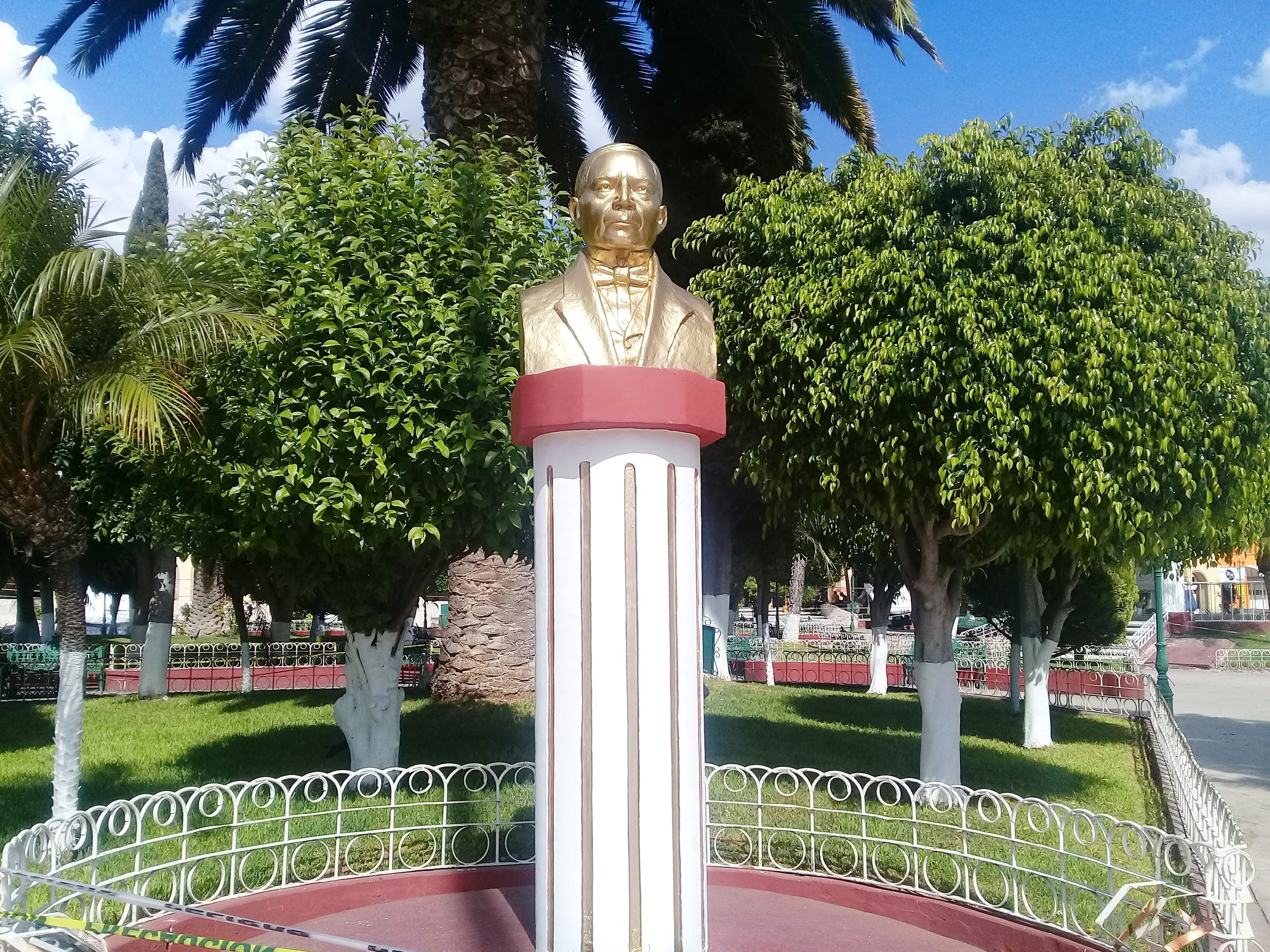
Monument to Benito Juarez.

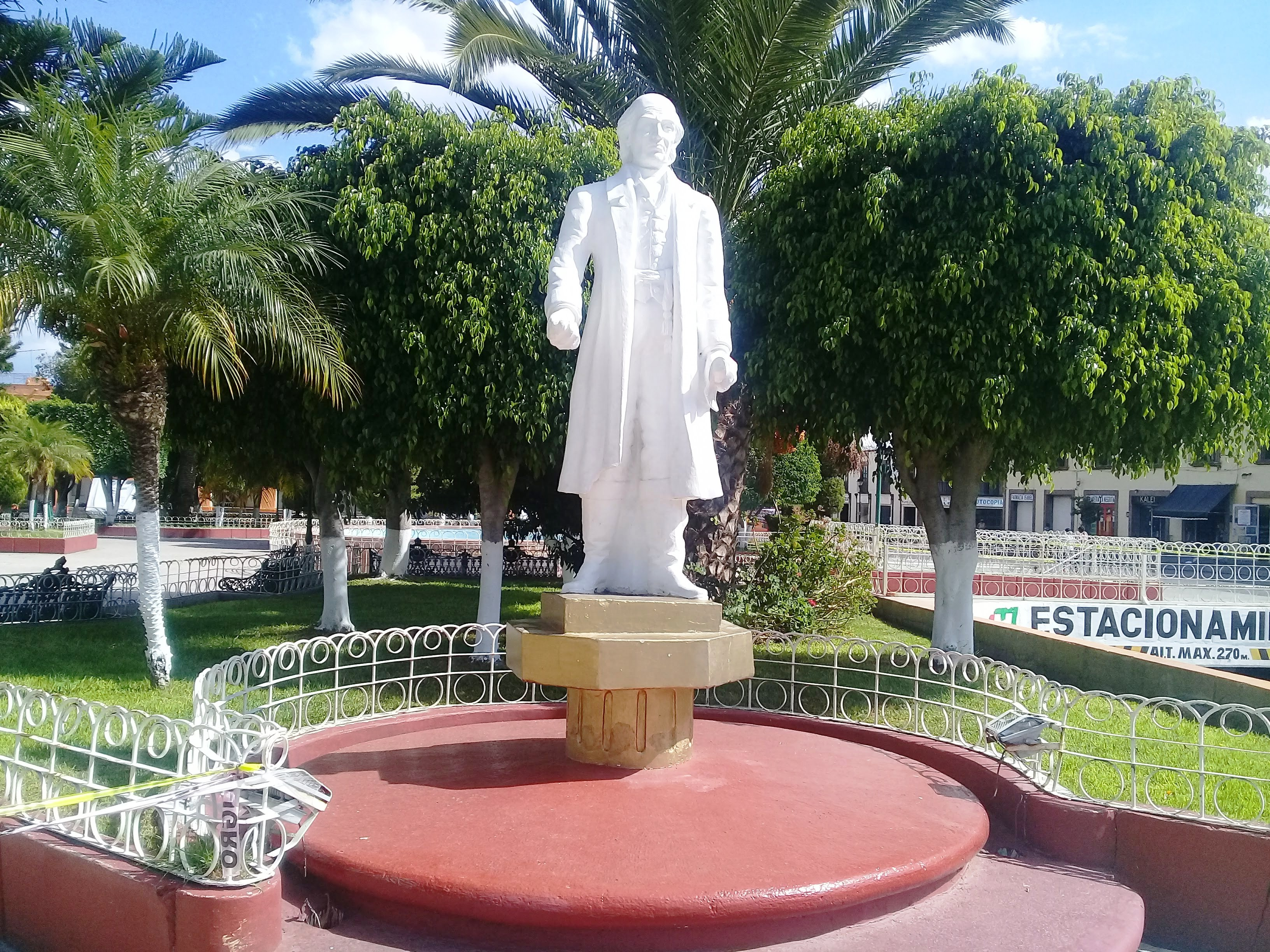
Monument to Miguel Hidalgo.

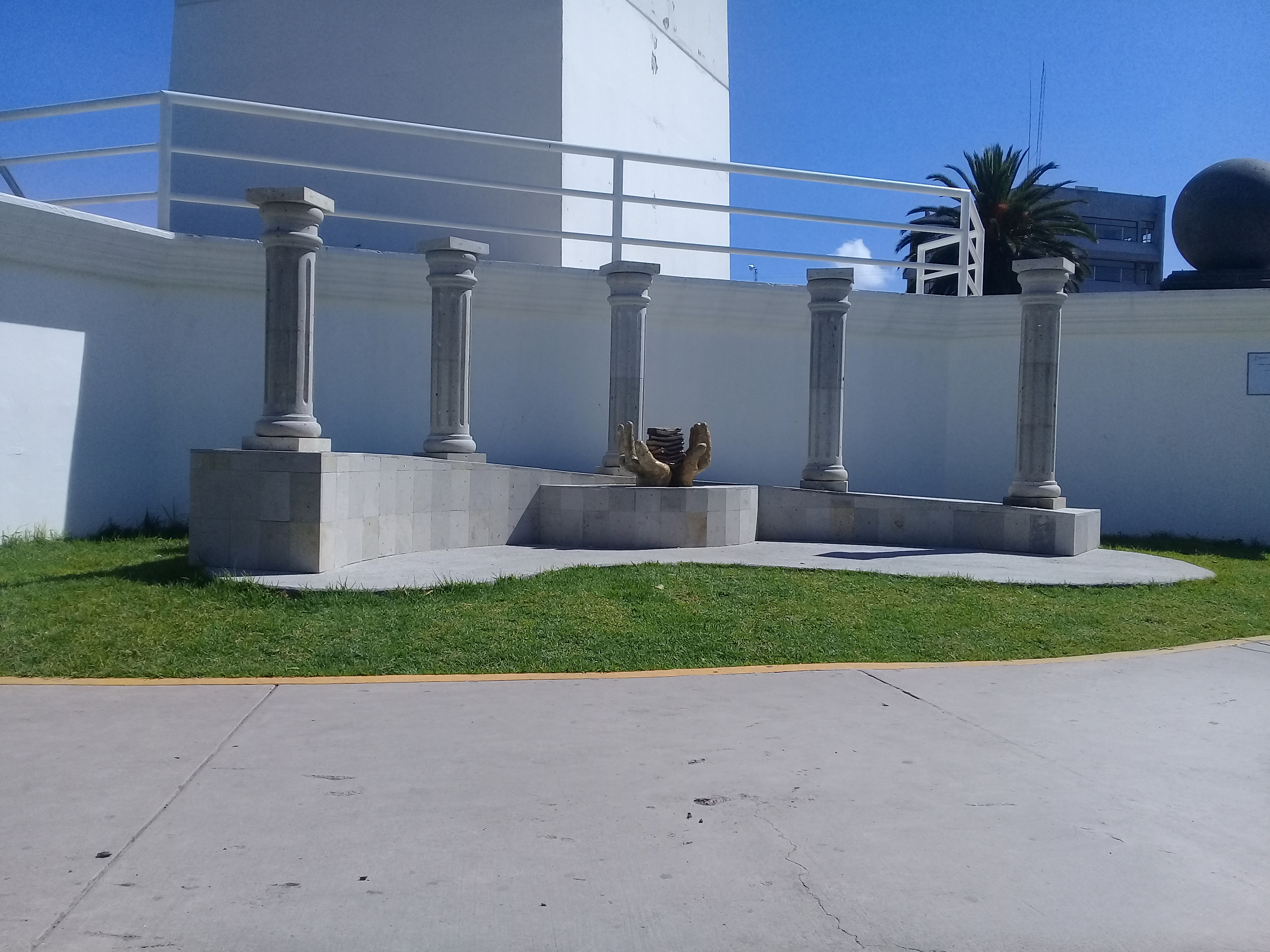
Monument to the Teacher.

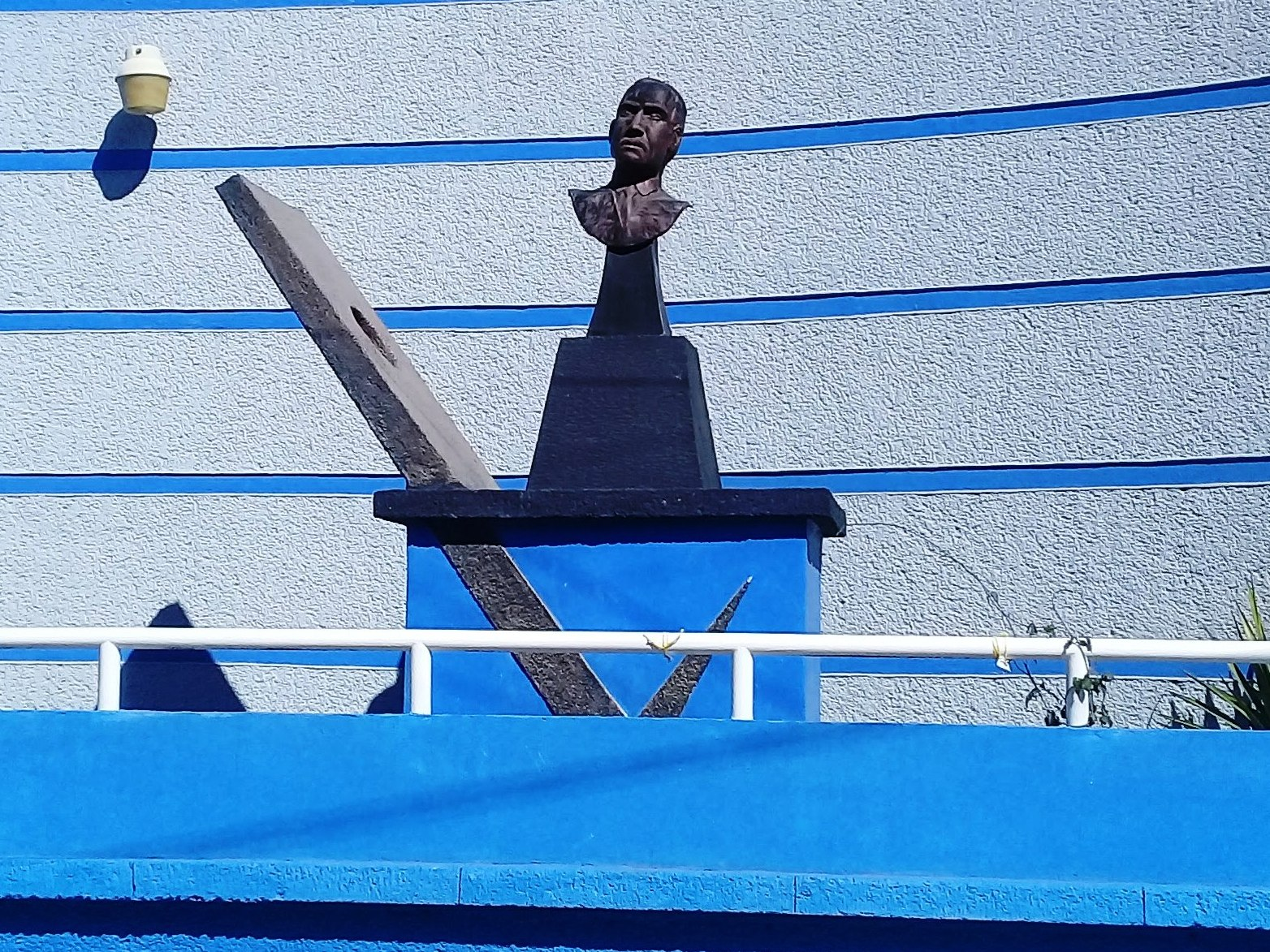
Monument to Efren Rebolledo.

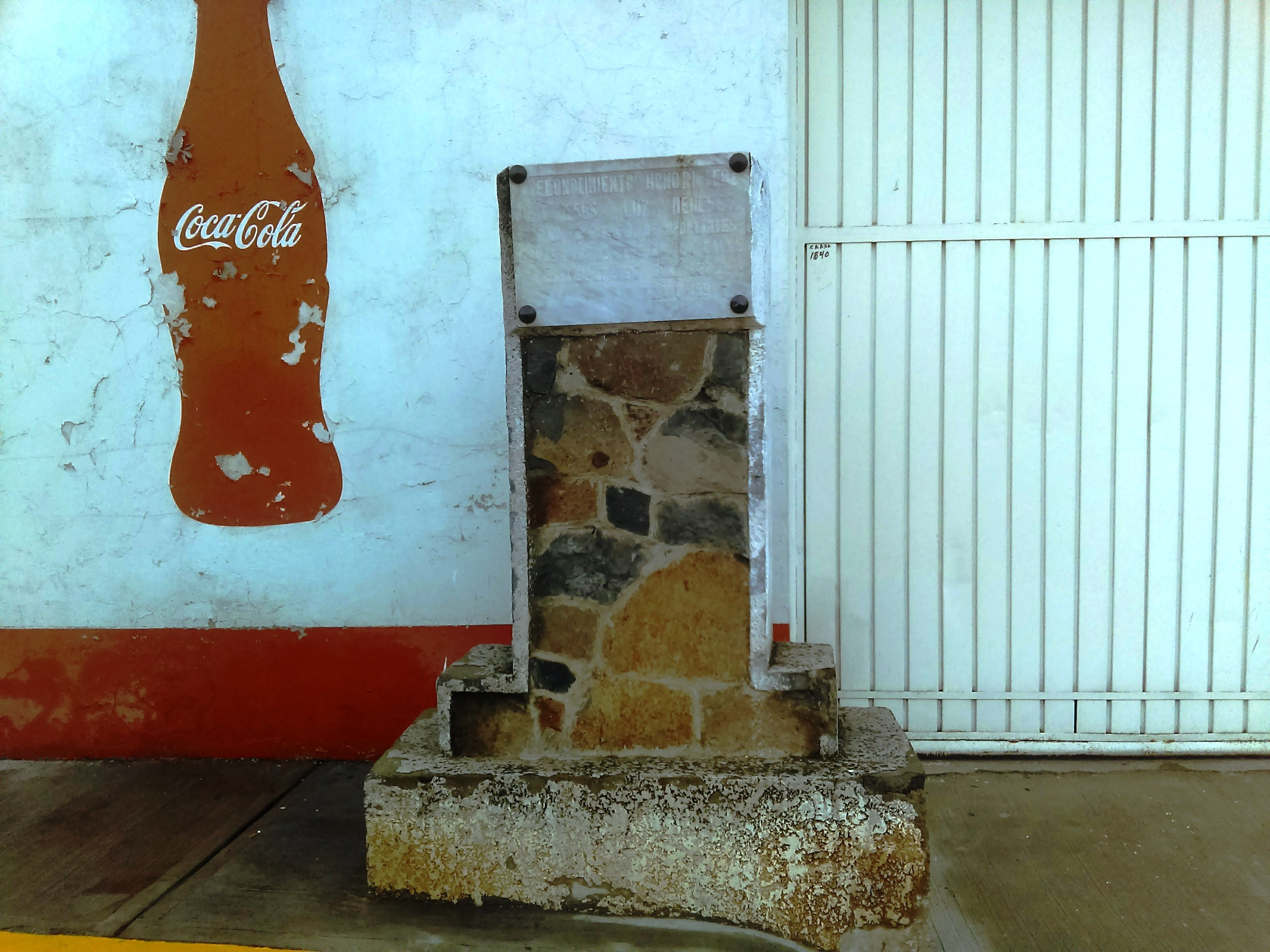
Monument to Jesús Luz Meneses.

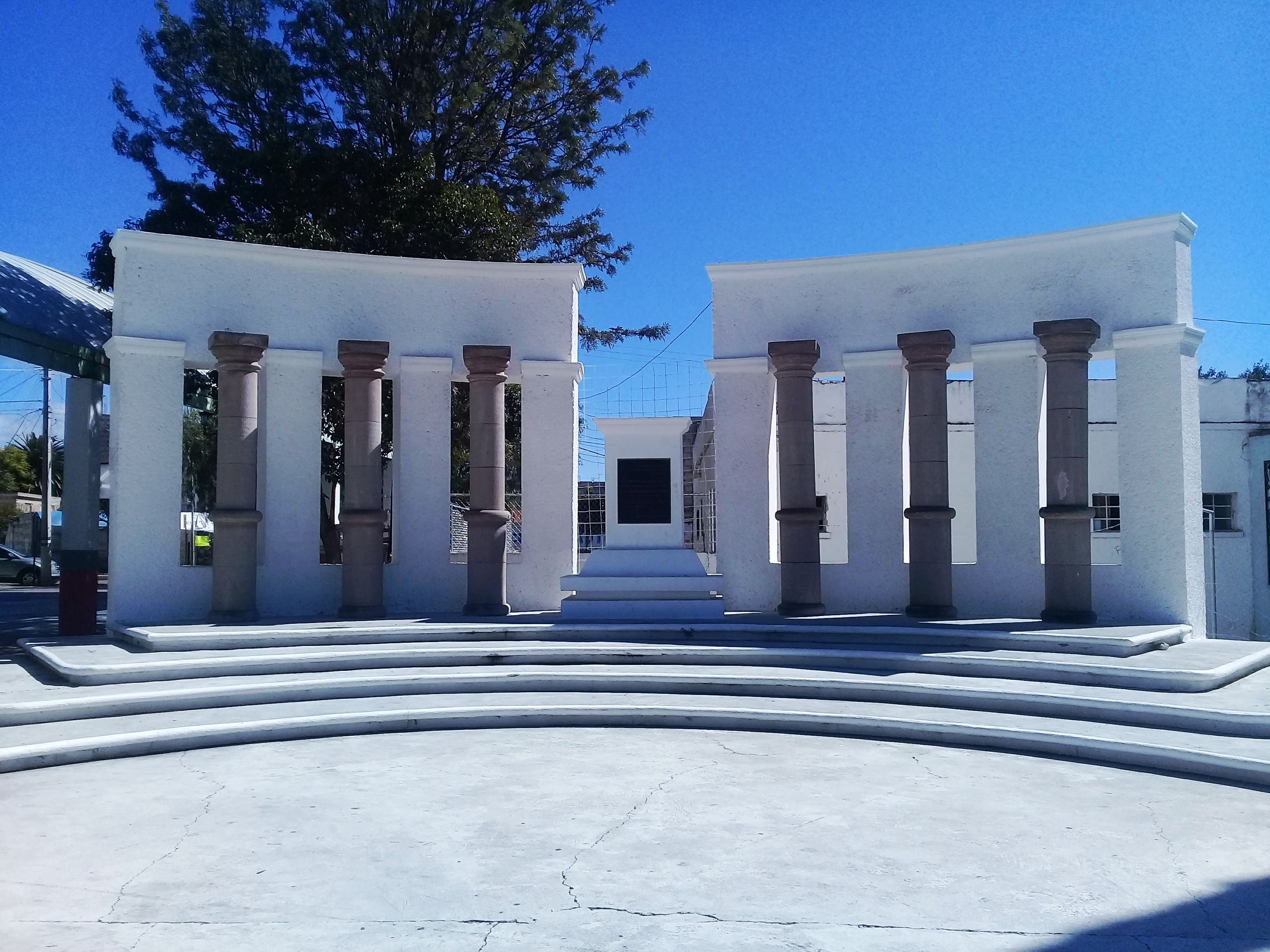
Monument to the Niños Héroes.

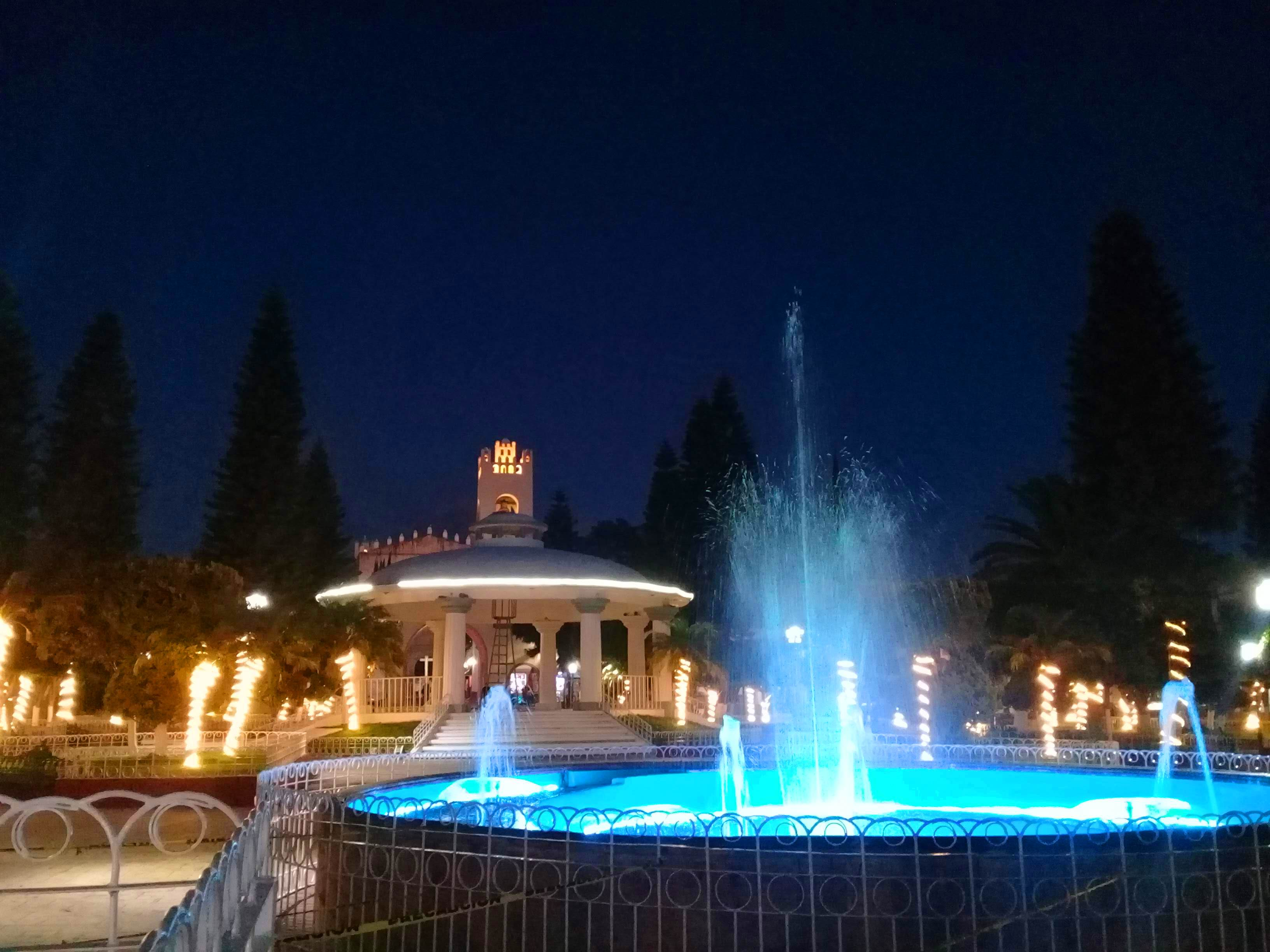
Fountain in Plaza Juarez.

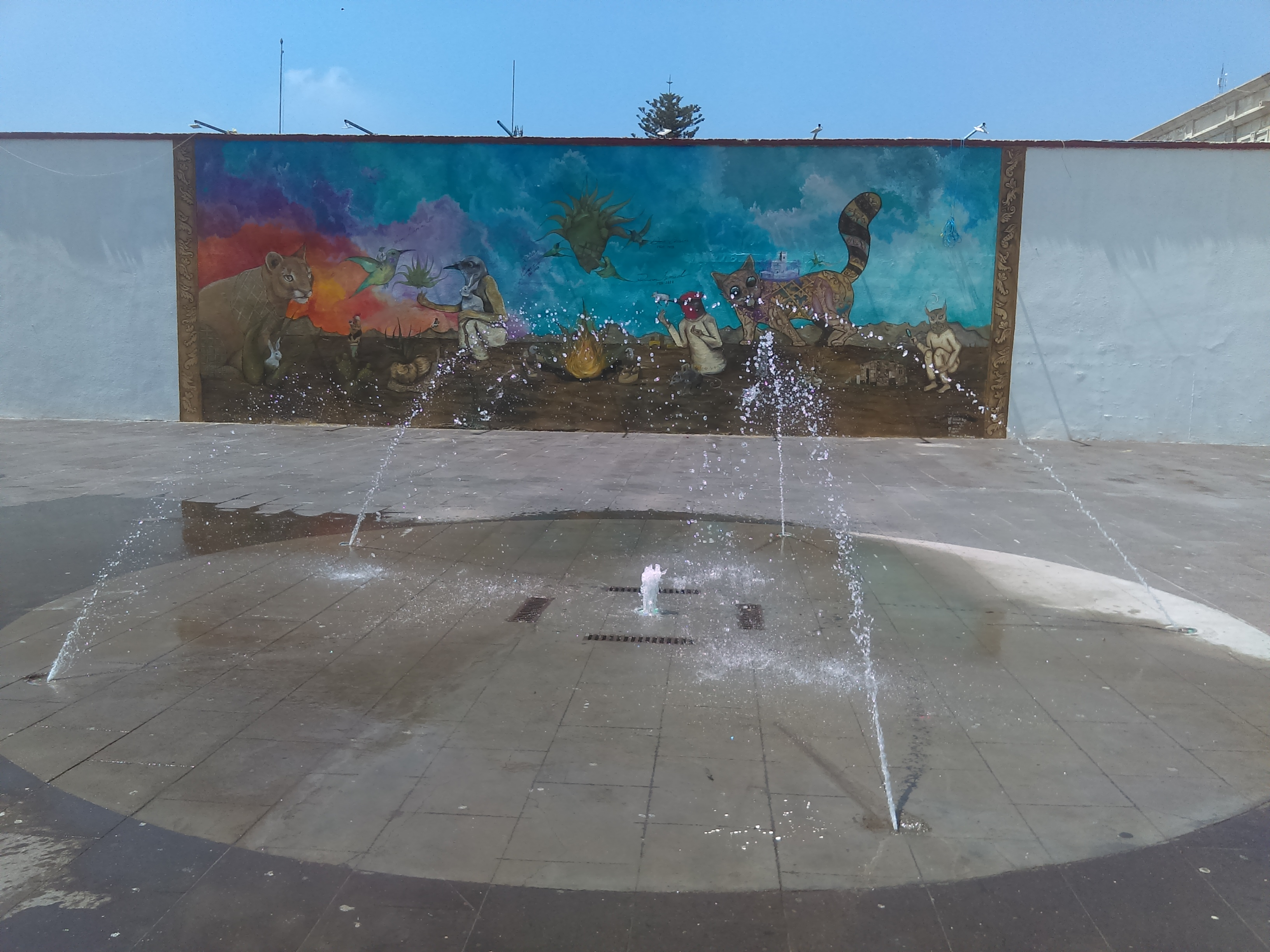
Fountain in Plaza Constitución.

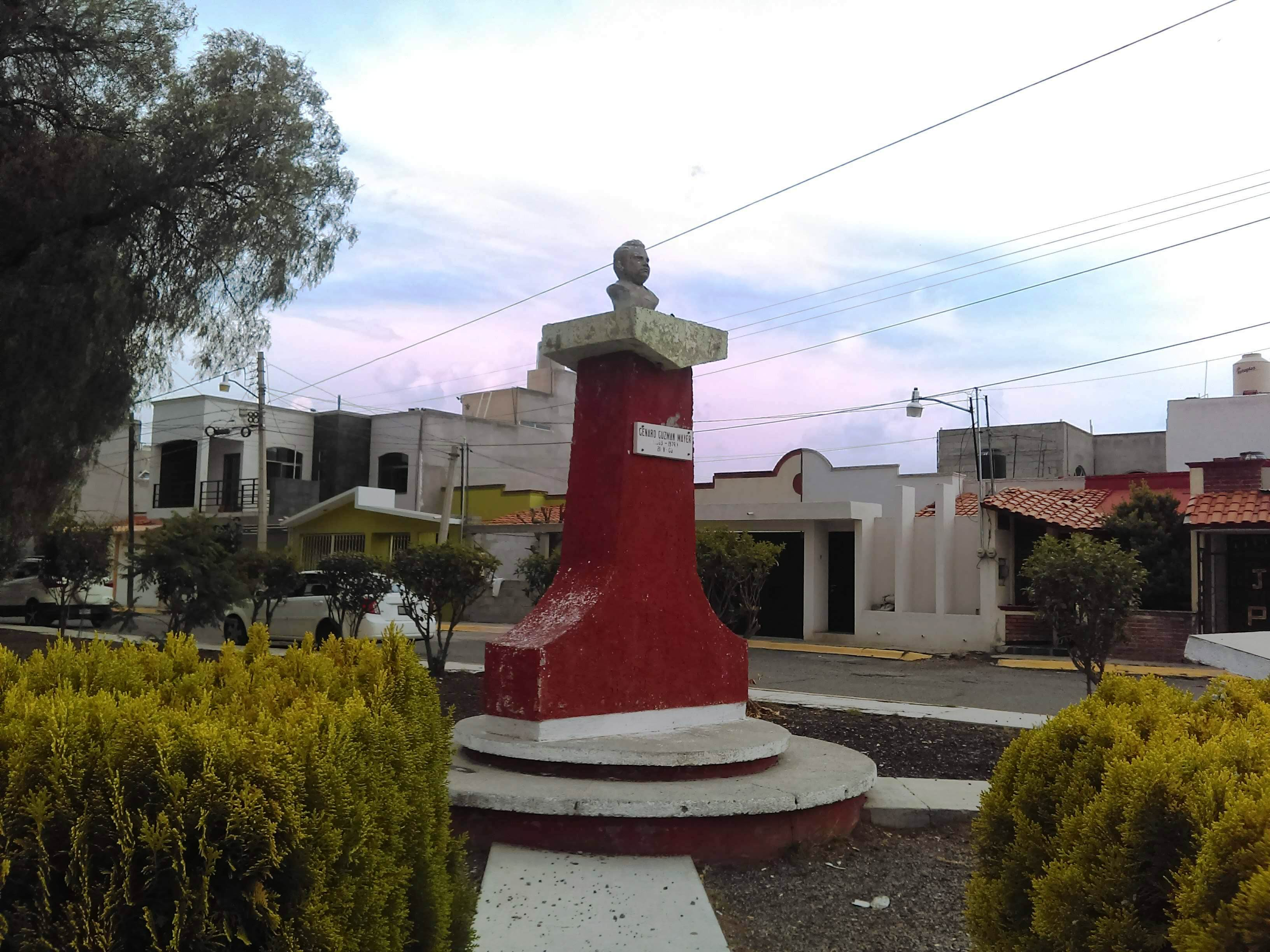
Monument to Genaro Guzmán Mayer.

==== Plazas and parks ====
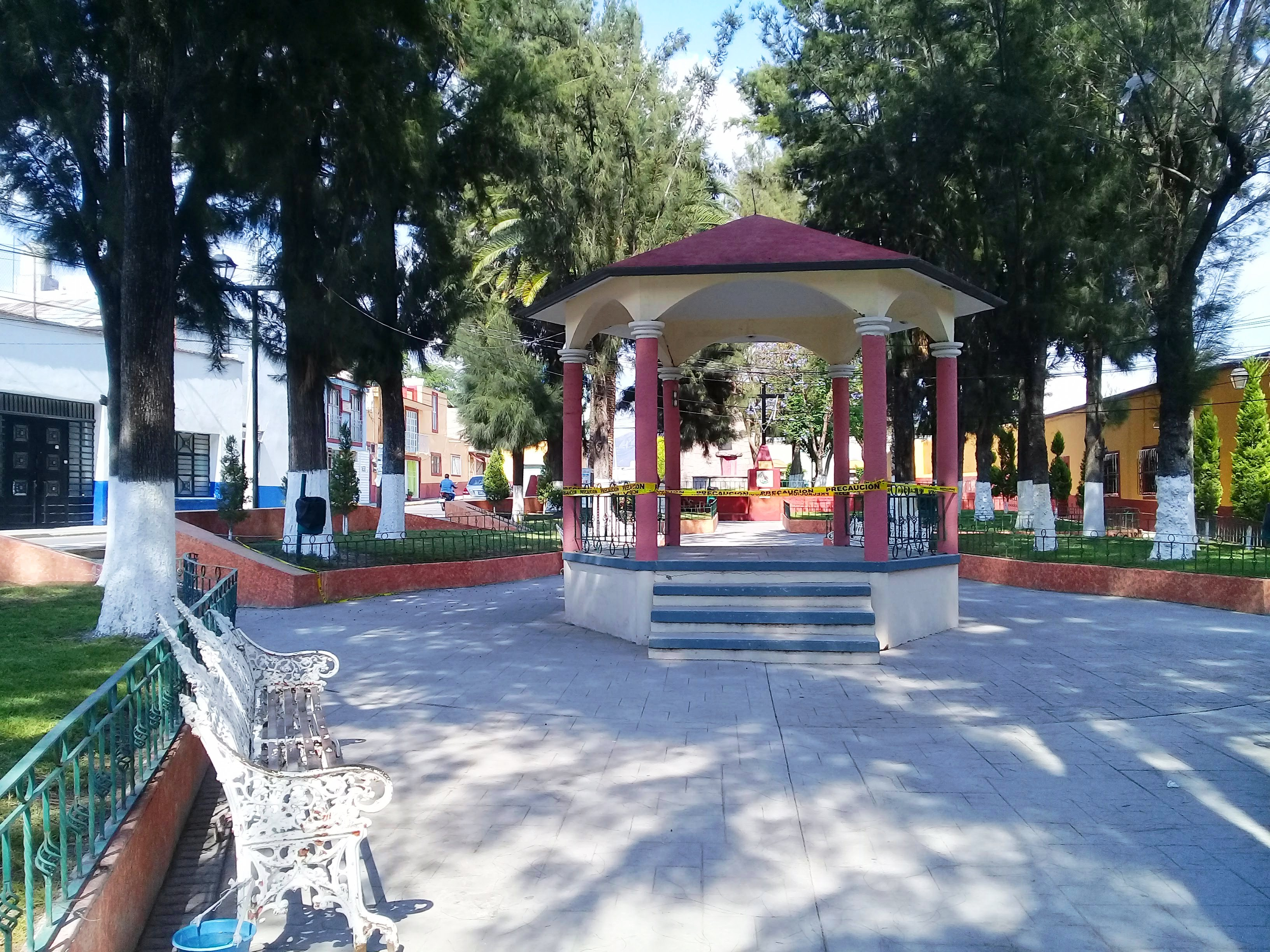
Nicolás Romero Garden "El Salto".

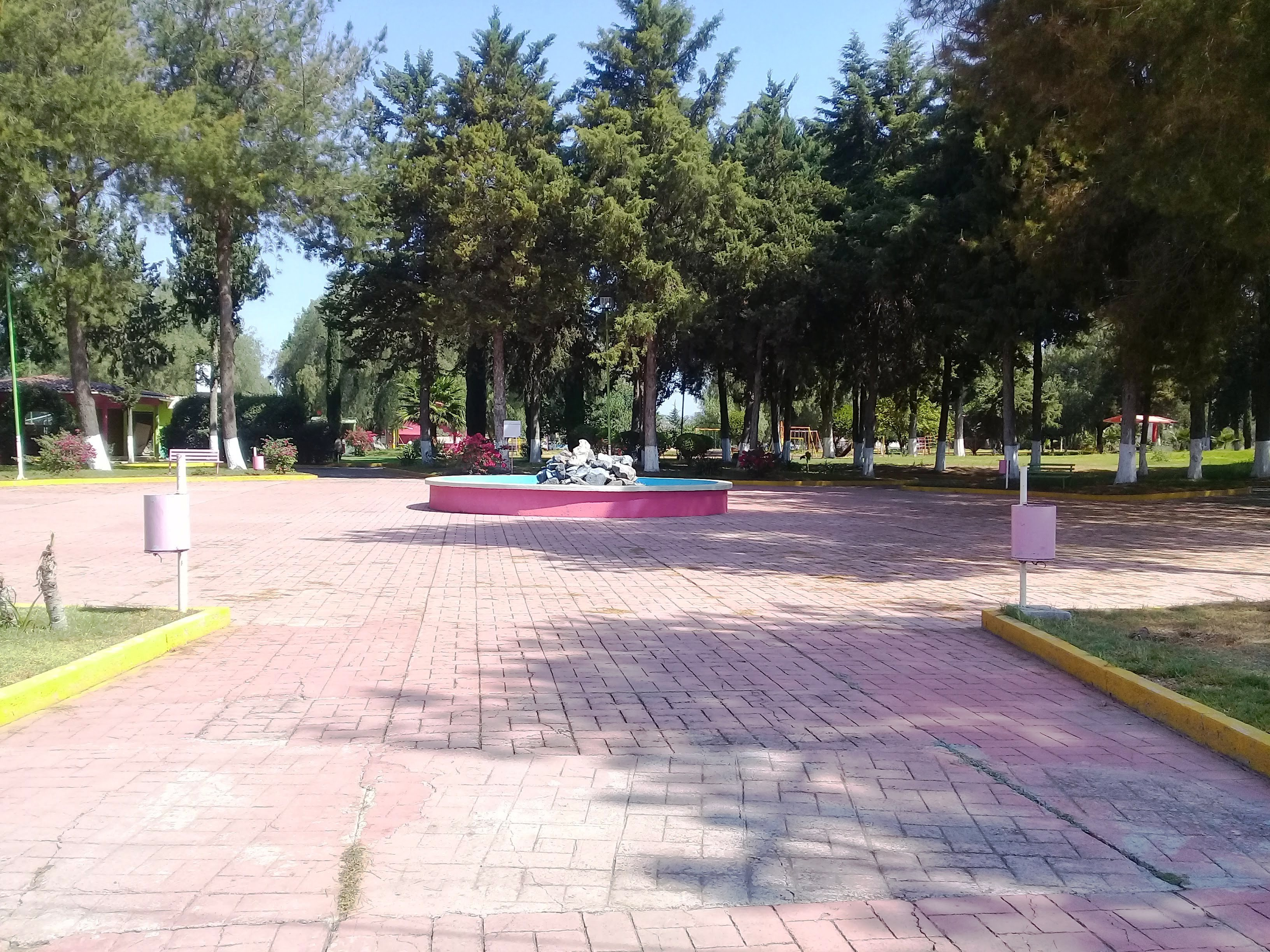
Recreational Park "La Eroca".

The city's green areas include Plaza Juárez, Parque Reforma, Jardín Nicolás Romero, and Parque Recreativo "La Eroca"; there are also parks in the Efrén Rebolledo (Parque Urbano), Guadalupe, and Guzmán Mayer colonies, with various playgrounds for children. In Plaza Juárez and Parque Reforma there are shoe-shine stands.

The Plaza Juárez is a wooded park with a kiosk or bandstand in the center. Access to the atrium of the Convent of San Nicolás de Tolentino is through a soportal, formed by a semicircular arcade, with a barrel vault roof. The central arch that gives access to the atrium is almost twice the size of the others, and is also roofed by a barrel vault, perpendicular to the one that covers the soportal. On March 3, 2014, construction began on a subway parking garage in Plaza Juarez, which was inaugurated on August 31, 2014.

The Reforma Park is where the Actopan Obelisk is located, as well as several playgrounds and exercise equipment. The Nicolás Romero Garden, also known as "El Salto" because of the old aqueduct cistern located there; in 2014 the cistern was transformed into a fountain and the park was remodeled. The Recreational Park "La Eroca" with green areas, sports, playgrounds, barbecue grills, and a swimming pool. There is also the Plaza de la Constitución, in front of the Municipal Palace; built in 2008 when part of the Old Municipal Palace was demolished.

=== Painting and murals ===
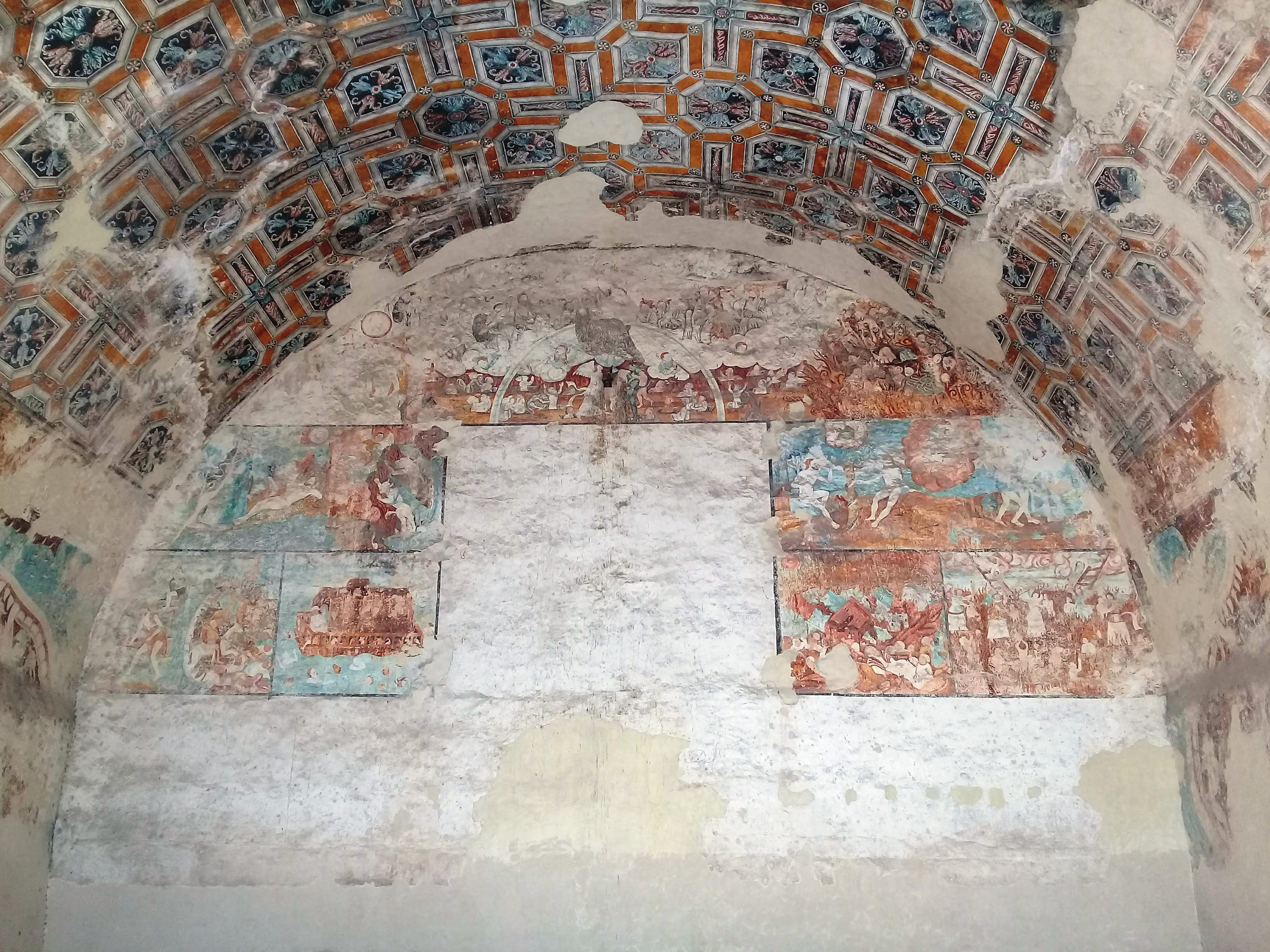
Convent of San Nicolás de Tolentino Murals

On the outskirts of the city in the main arcade of the Actopan Aqueduct, also known as "Los Arcos", there is a set of white cave paintings. Oriented to the southeast, a human figure can be seen that measures 32 cm high and 23 cm wide. To the left side is a sun with three elongated rays, which measures 23 cm high and 22.5 cm wide; to the right a half moon of 9.5 cm long and 6.5 cm high is observed. Also a hand is appreciated that sees toward the northwest, and this almost completely erased. In direction to the northwest in the same rock is an inverted "U" that in its interior seven points are found, indicating possibly a celestial vault.

In the Convent of Actopan, the iconographic and iconological program is one of the most complex and ambitious in the state of Hidalgo. It is necessary to consider the Renaissance painting as preponderant aesthetic ideology, and the reminiscences of the mural painting of Mesoamerica, in the mixture of the decoration and the Christian subjects; characteristics of the tequitqui or Indo-Christian art. The murals and frescoes of the profundis room, the stairway cube and the open chapel stand out.

Different murals have been painted in the city, inside the Actopan Obelisk there are a series of murals, where different aspects of the culture, history and identity of Actopan can be appreciated. On May 15, 2015, at the Actopan High School, 23 murals were made in the facilities, as part of the fifth International Image Festival (FINI), and the second International Meeting of Muralists; under the theme "Social Justice", with the participation of 46 international muralists and 22 students.

In 2015 after the remodeling of the July 8 Market, two murals were made, both reflecting the customs and traditions of Actopan. In 2016 a mural was made on the stairs of the Municipal Palace of Actopan, signed by Eloy Trejo Trejo, in the "Actopan es.... Arte, cultura y tradición" mural, the Convent of Actopan and Efren Rebolledo are appreciated. On July 8, 2017, a mural was inaugurated by the Casa de la Cultura Actopan, to commemorate the 471st anniversary of the founding of the city, located in the porch of the Municipal Palace.

In November 2019, students from Escuela Superior de Actopan created a mural located in the center of María del Carmen González Street, in which the mural combines the social theme, violence against women, the LGBT community and gender equality. On September 4, 2020, the " Actopan Pueblo con sabor" mural was inaugurated in the Plaza Constitución; it shows the cultural heritage of the municipality and was created by the artists Daniel Rojo Pacheco, Juan Ugalde Olguín, Alexis Gómez, José Lionel López and Gerardo Zamora.

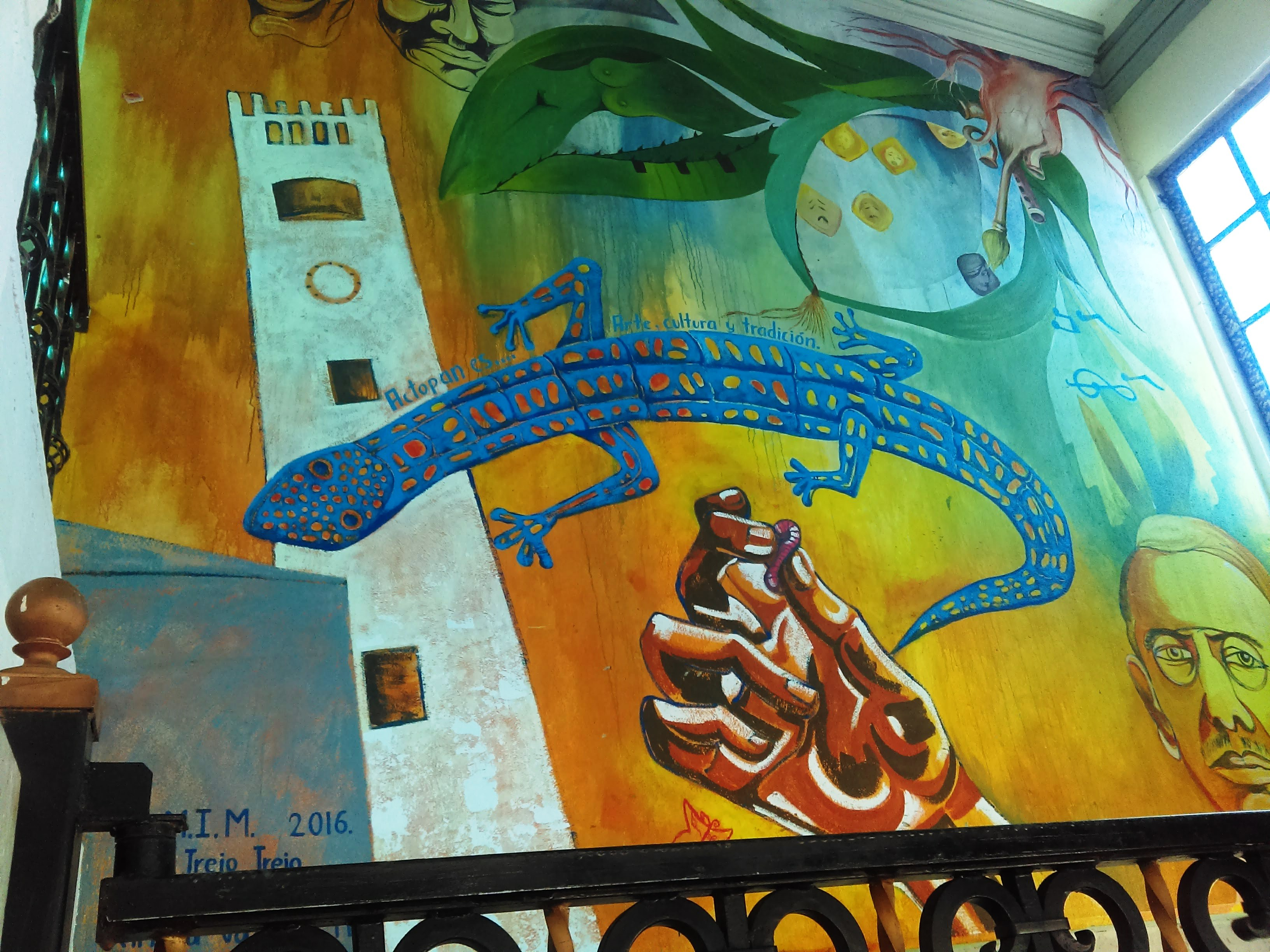
"Actopan is... Art, culture and tradition" mural.

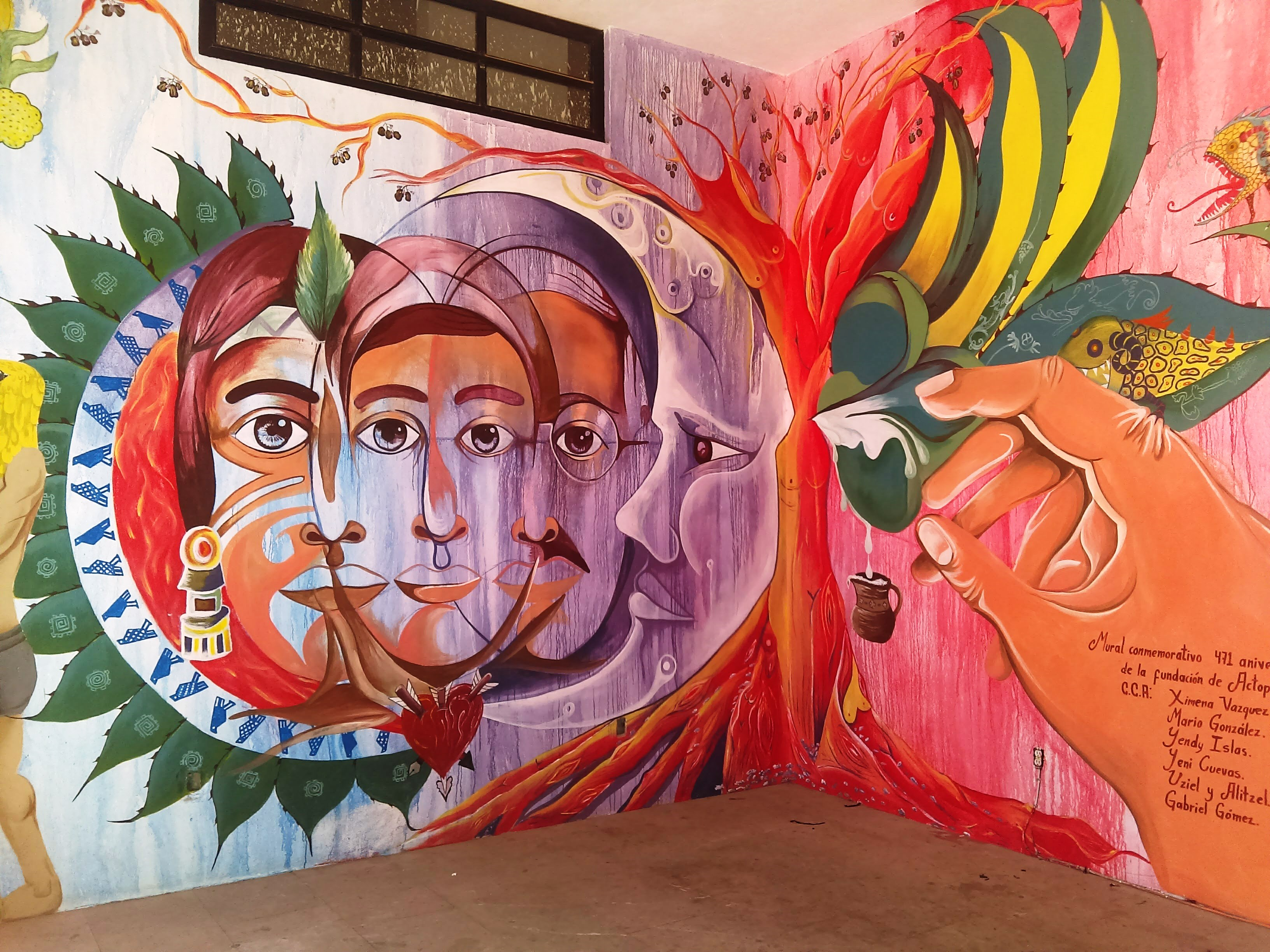
"471st anniversary of the foundation of Actopan" mural.

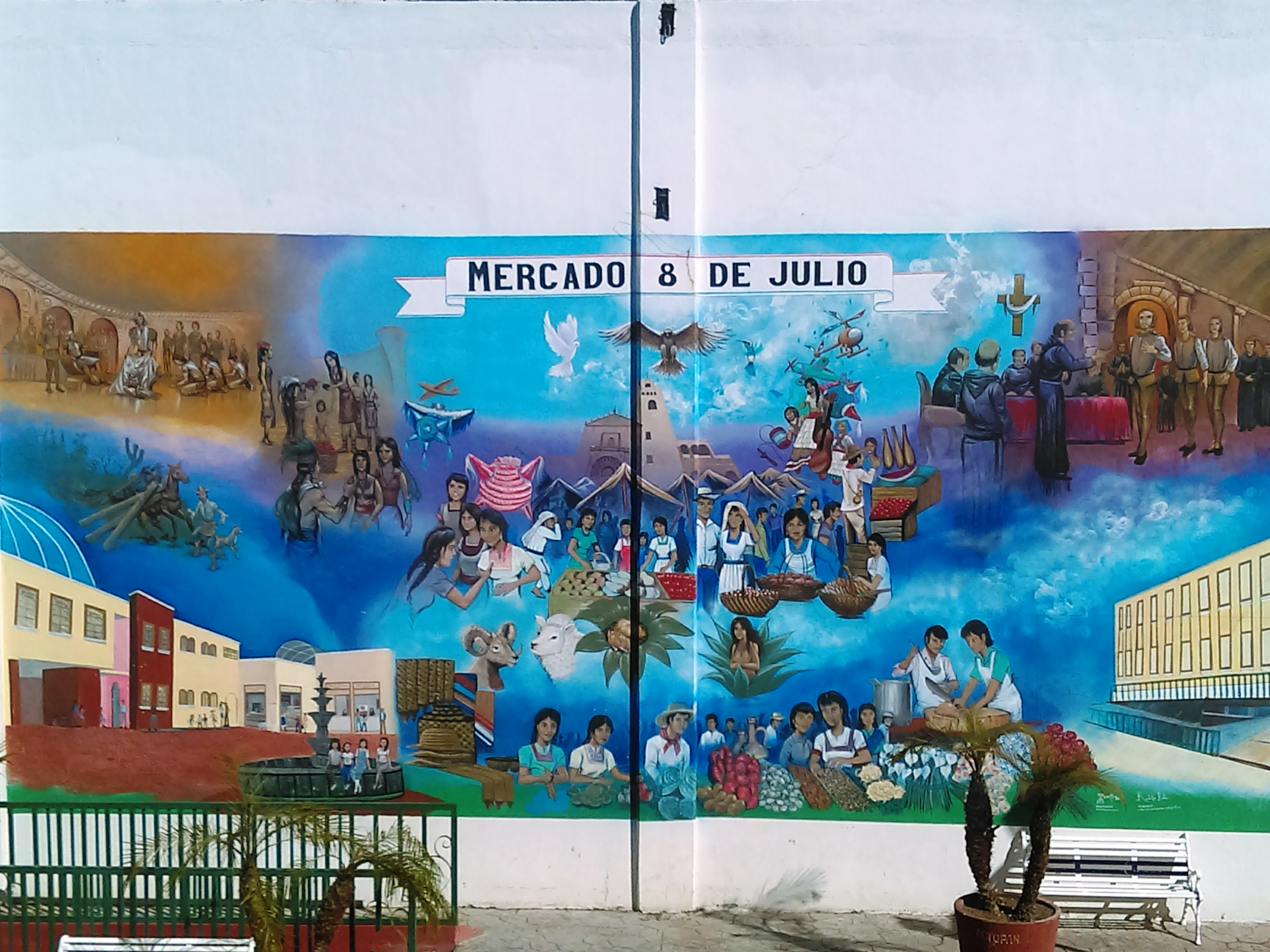
Mural in the Mercado 8 de Julio.

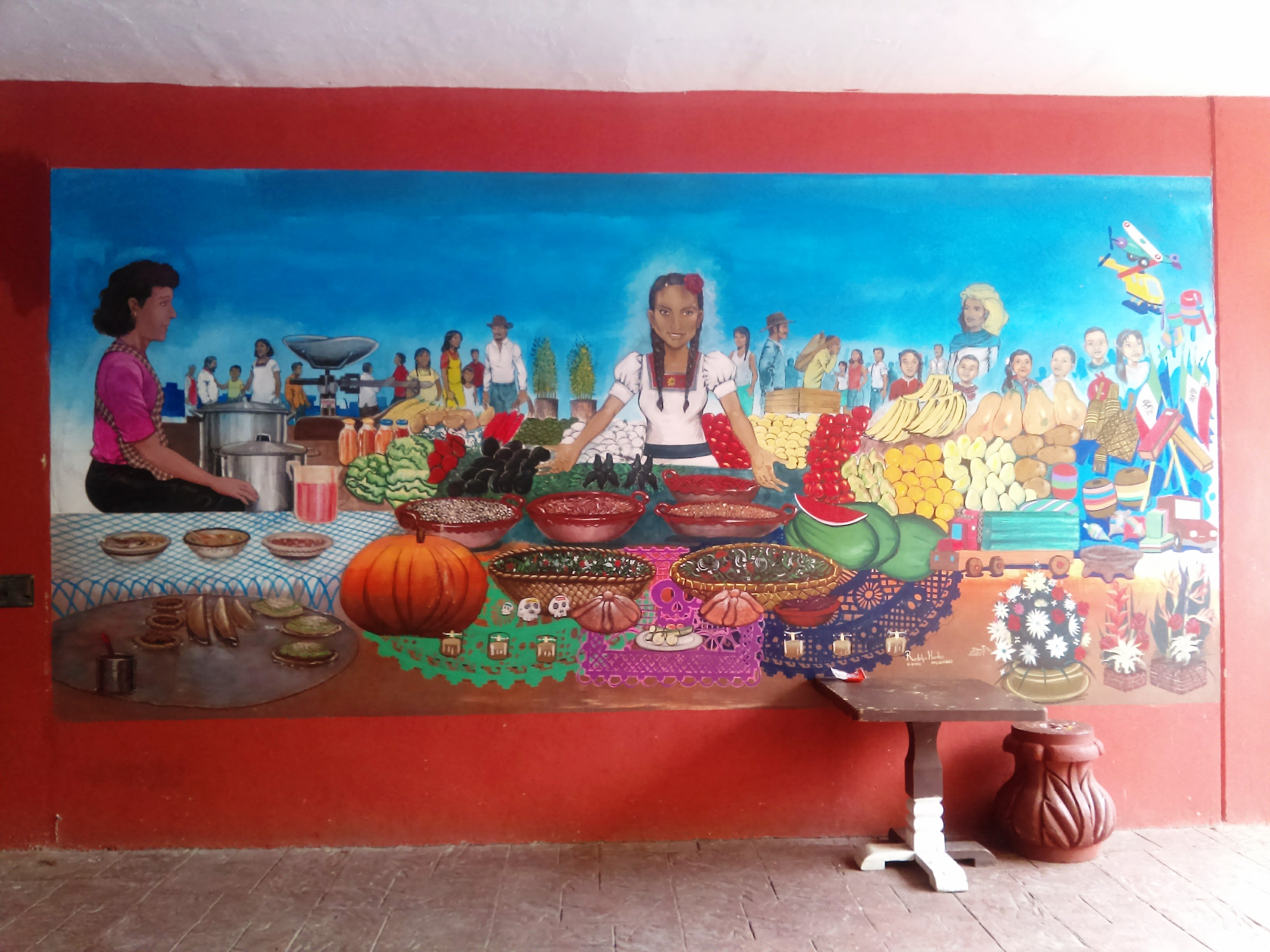
Mural in the 8 de Julio market.

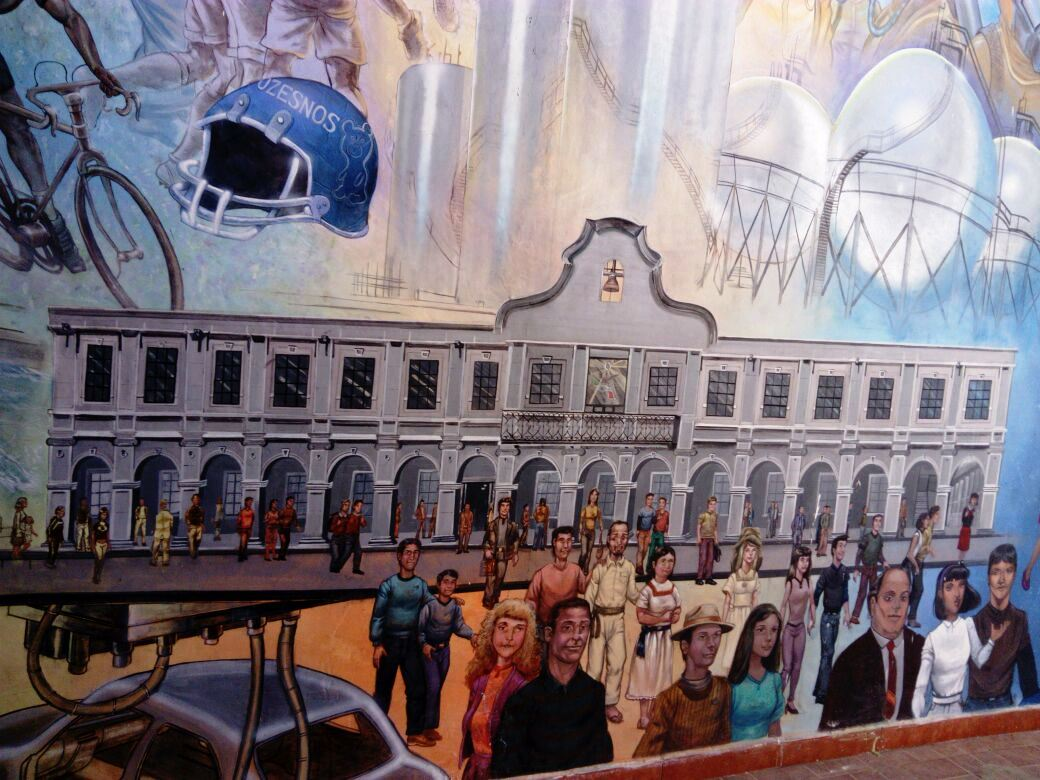
Mural at the Actopan Obelisk.

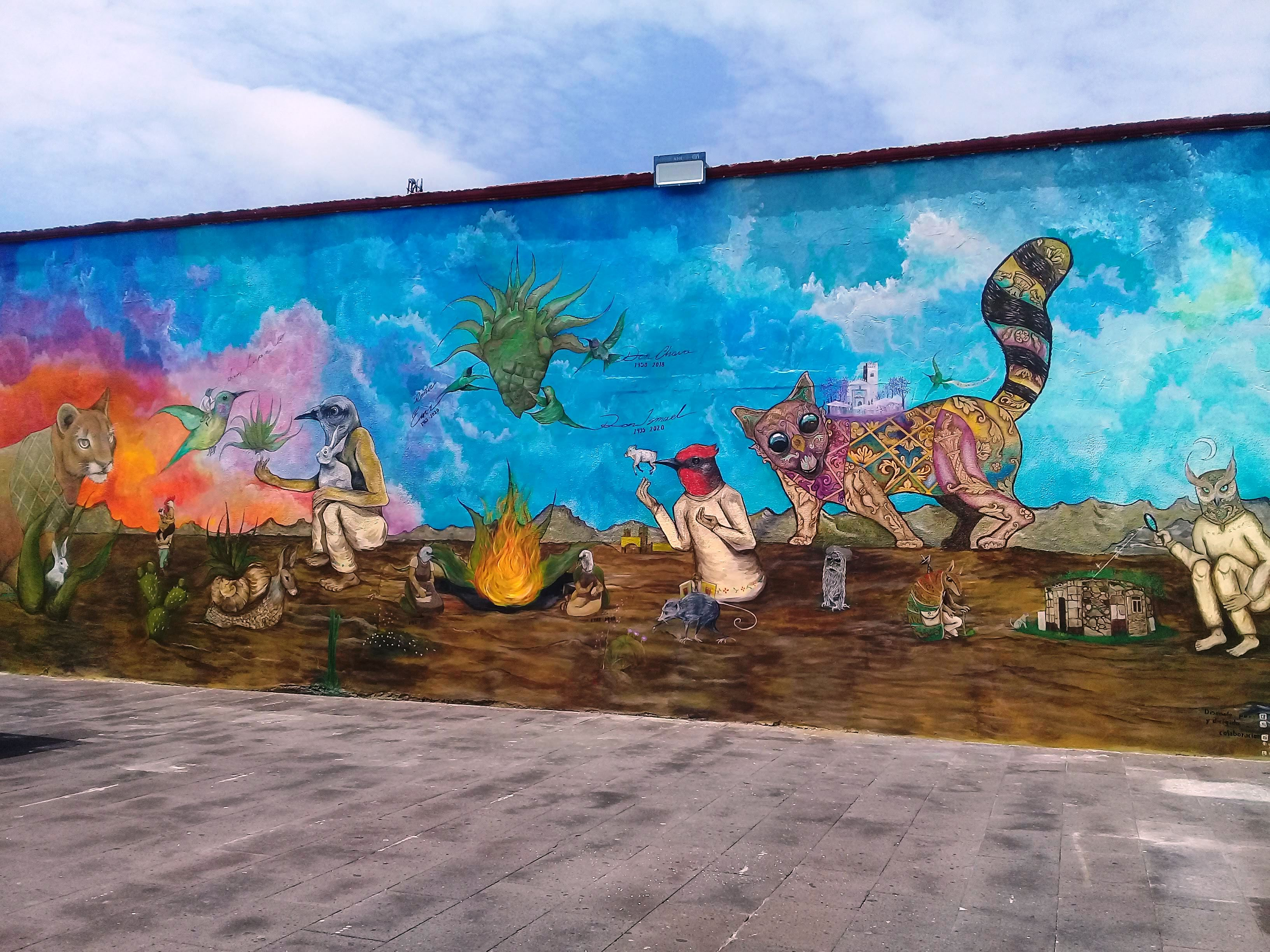
"Actopan, pueblo con sabor" mural.

=== Museums and cultural centers ===
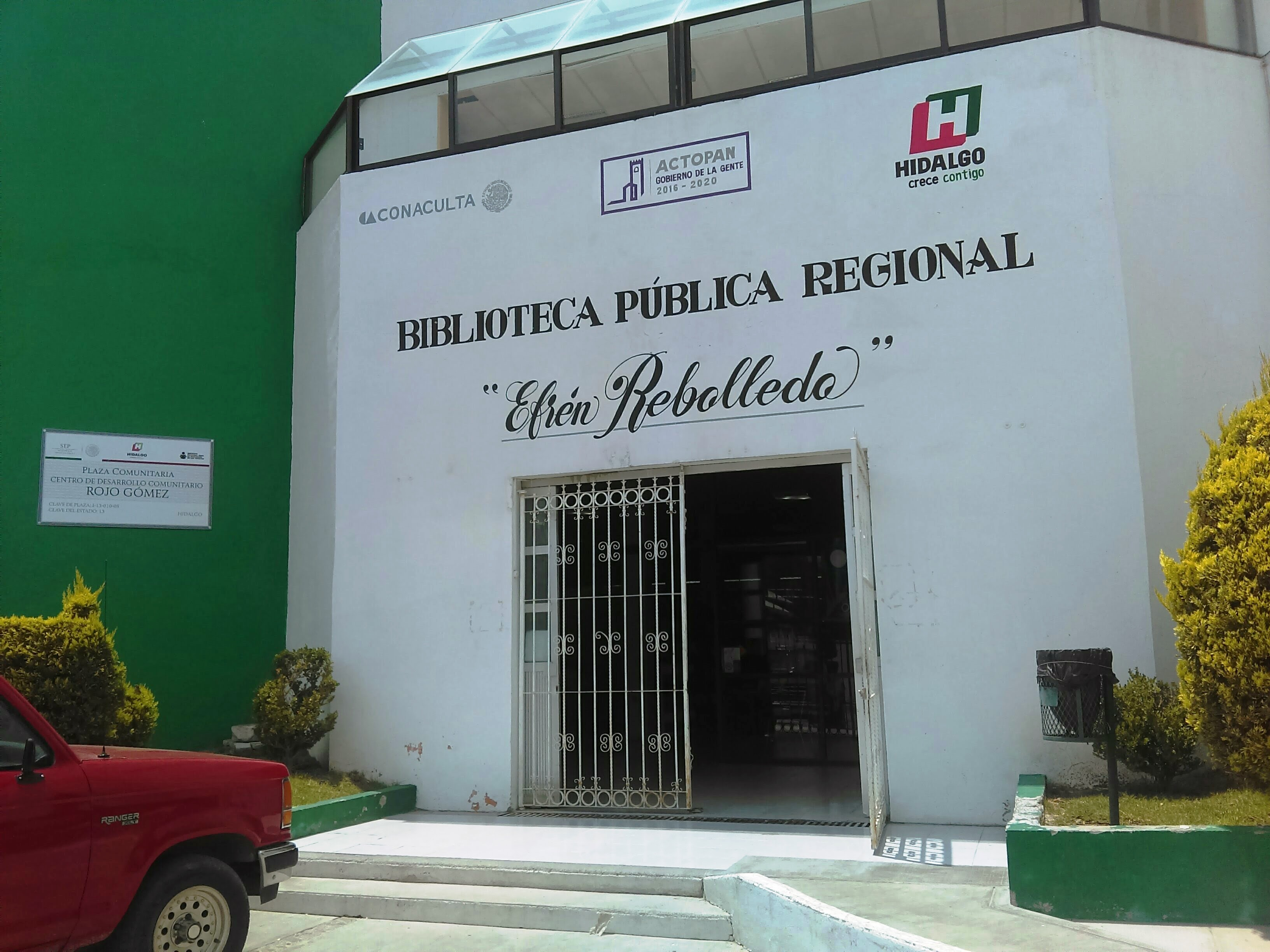
Efrén Rebolledo library.

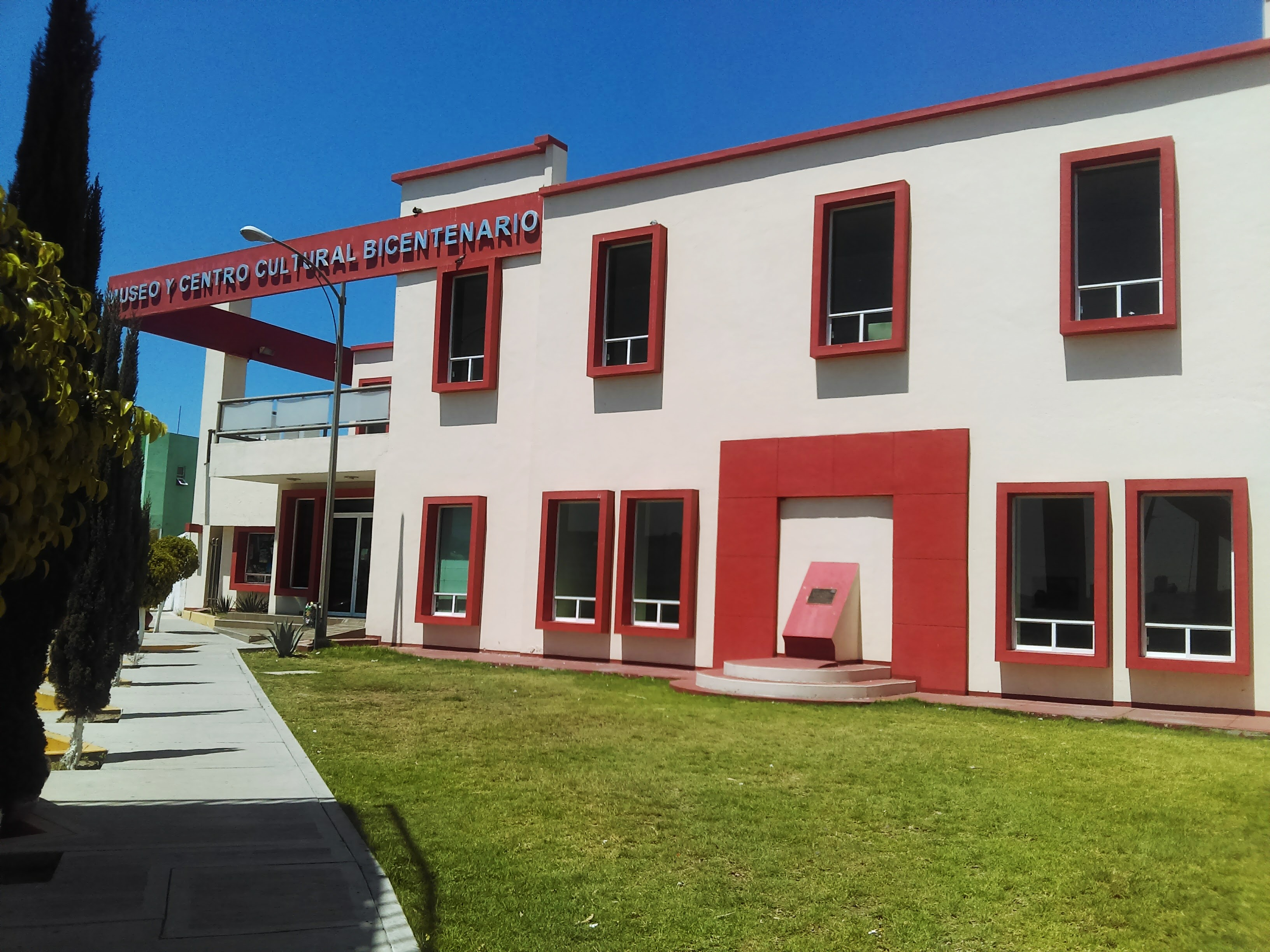
Bicentennial Museum and Cultural Center.

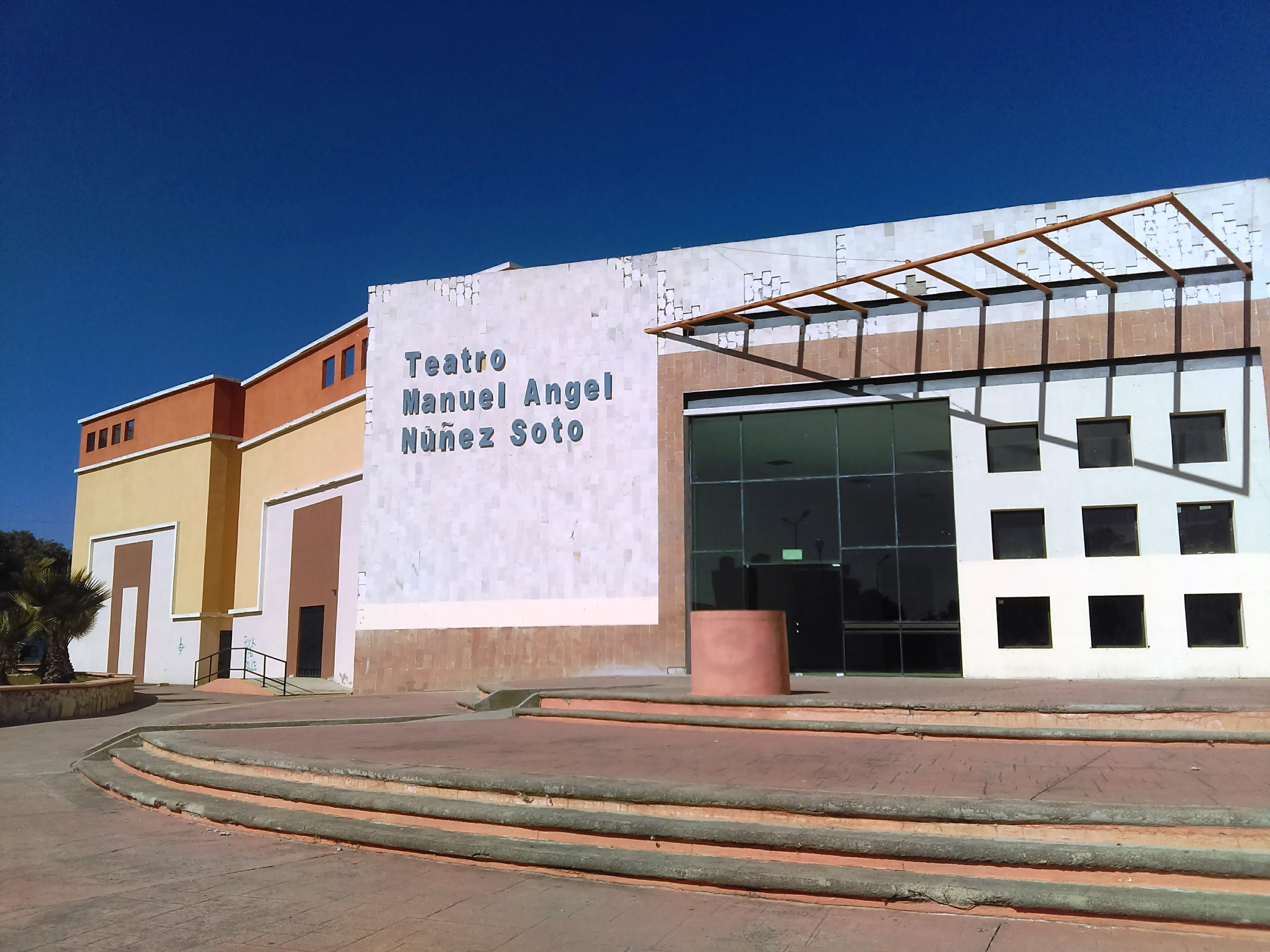
Manuel Ángel Núñez Soto Theater

The city has a public library called: Efrén Rebolledo Municipal Public Library, which has 3,000 volumes of books, magazines, pamphlets, etc., in addition to carrying out activities during the holiday period by teaching courses to the children's community.

It has a House of Culture founded on January 24, 1991; where different courses in singing, ceramics, literature, dance, sculpture, photography, painting, theater, etc. are offered. There is also the Manuel Ángel Núñez Soto Theater with a seating capacity of 820 people.

The Museum of Religious Art was inaugurated on January 1, 2011, it is located inside the Church and ex-convent of San Nicolás de Tolentino. It has four permanent exhibition rooms and contains Viceroyalty and 18th century art, with carved wood furniture, religious oil paintings from the 18th and 19th centuries, as well as several painted and stewed sculptures.

On December 20, 2010, the Bicentennial Museum and Cultural Center was inaugurated; its interiors are designed to offer courses in dance, sculpture, painting, music and other arts, as well as exhibitions and the sale of handicrafts. On May 24, 2021, the Actopan City Hall informed the demolition of the building due to differential settlements and structural risks. The damage to the property is estimated at twelve million pesos. The demolition has not been carried out and there are no dates for its action.

On August 30, 2011, construction began on the Los Frailes Sports Museum, also known as the "Sports Gallery"; it opened its doors to the public on January 13, 2012. The building consists of two floors: the first floor, with an area of 165 m^{2}, houses a lobby, stairs, gallery and an exhibition pavilion; and the second floor consists of a meeting room, restrooms and terrace with a view of the Los Frailes Sports Field.

The Los Frailes Sports Museum is dedicated to different Actopan athletes such as: Velia Flores Guerrero, selected in the Paralympic Games of Sydney 2000 and Athens 2004, cyclists Rubén Lugo Caballero, State Sports Award 2002 and Gabriel Cuéllar Valdez, selected in the Olympic Games of Mexico 1968, and in the Pan American Games of Winnipeg 1967, and who was National Road Champion in 1966 and 1968.

=== Festivities ===
All Mexican commemorations are celebrated in the city. In the first days of March, a parade is held to commemorate the arrival of spring with preschool students. On September 13 there is a civic ceremony for the Niños Héroes, with the participation of the different educational institutions. The Anniversary of the Independence of Mexico is celebrated with the representation of the Cry of Dolores by the Mayor, sale of Mexican snacks, fireworks display and a popular dance, all this on September 15. On September 16, a commemorative parade is held by the city's elementary schools with an average attendance of 3,000 people. During the Anniversary of the Mexican Revolution on November 20, a commemorative parade is held in charge of high schools and the general public, with an attendance of approximately 3,000 people, In addition, since 2010 a Huapango contest is held in the city, which will bring together between 200 and 250 competitors from different states.

=== Religious and patronal feast days ===
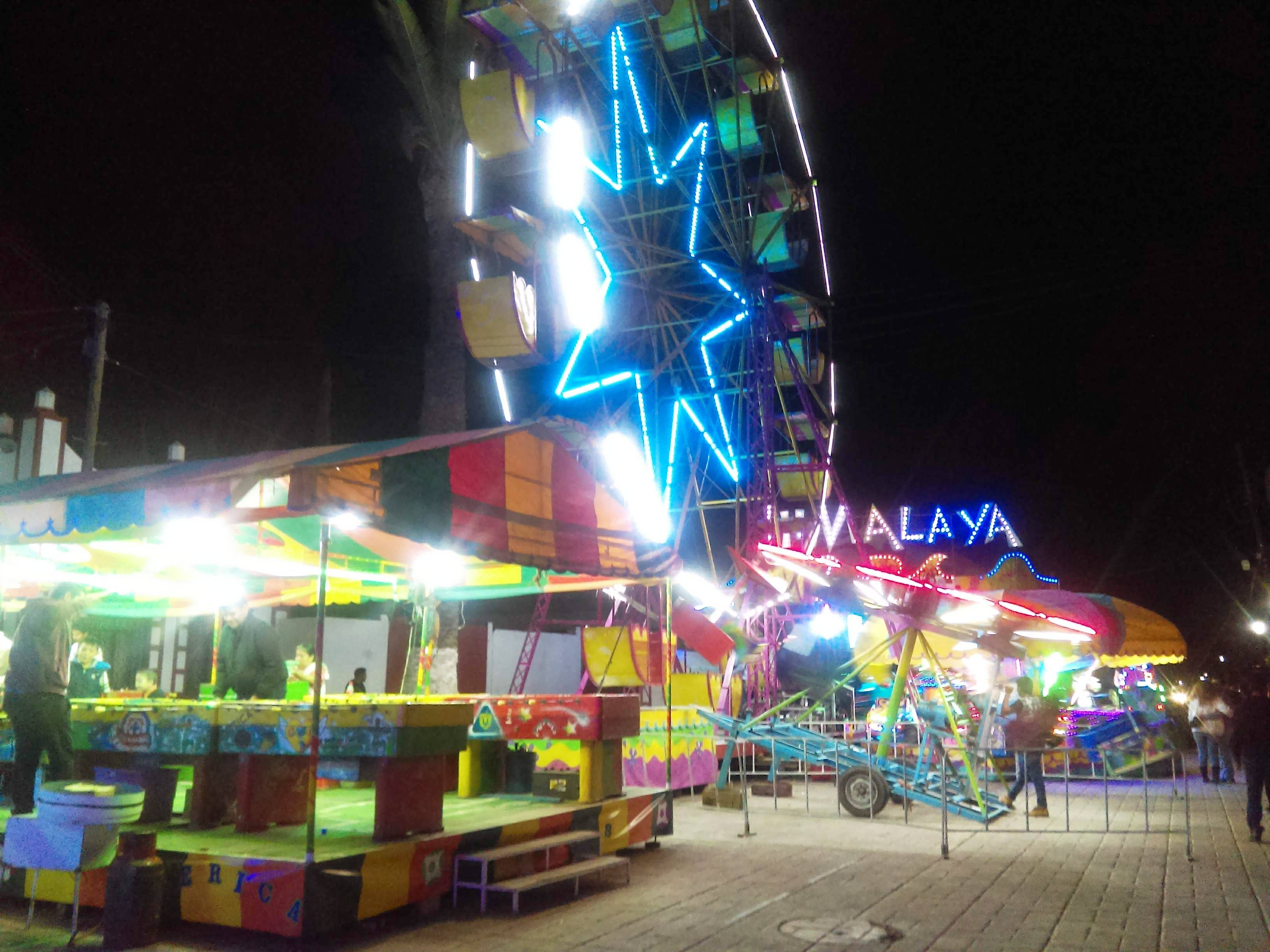
San Nicolás de Tolentino Patron Saint's Day.

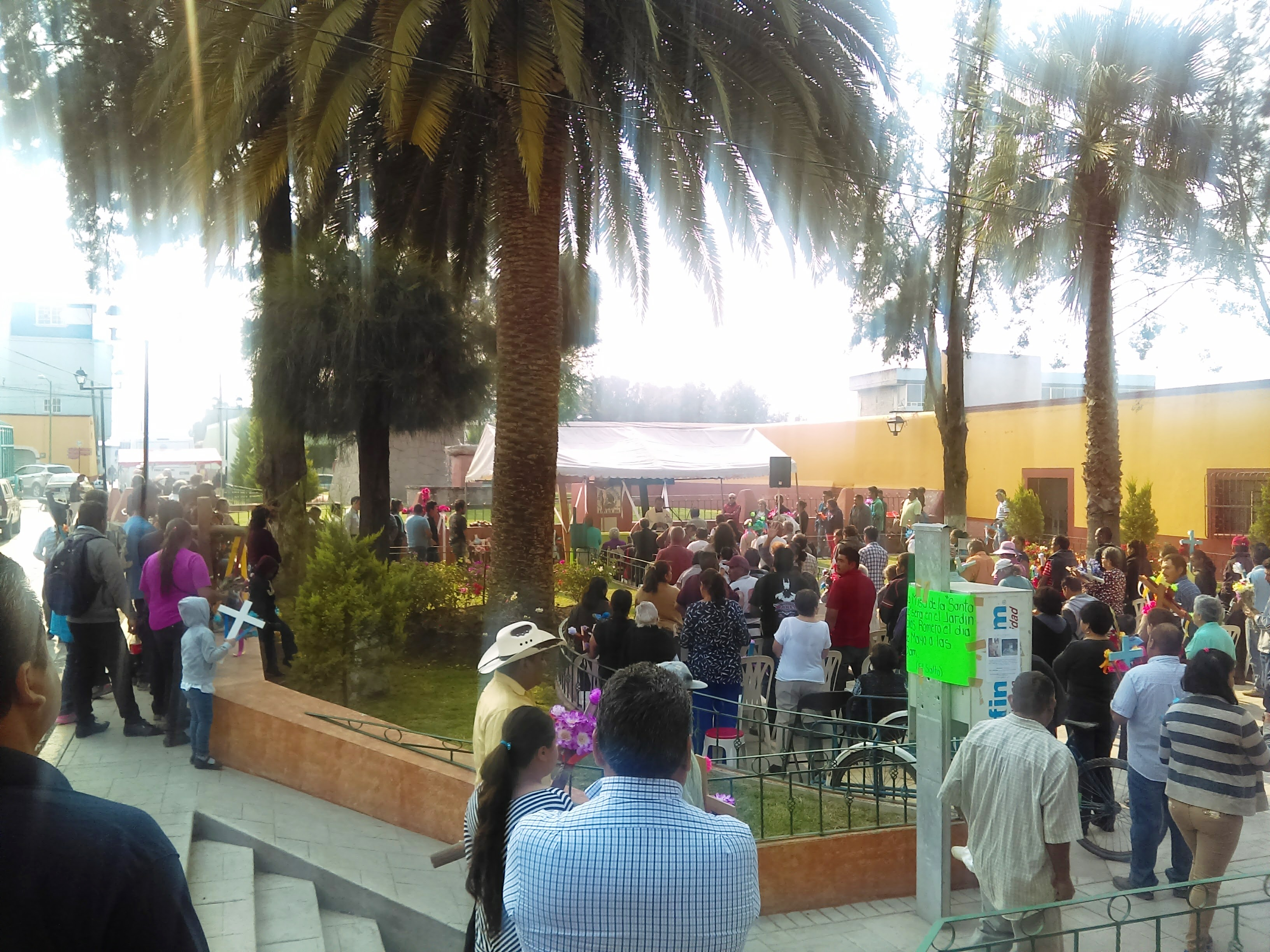
Mass on May 3 at the El Salto Garden.

Among the main religious festivals in the city are the Día de la Candelaria on February 2. A tradition in Mexico is to dress up the figures every year for each presentation that takes place, and eat tamales that day. The celebration of the Cruz de Mayo, held on May 3, this celebration dedicated to the raising of the cross is held almost everywhere in the city and at construction sites. In the "El Salto" garden, a mass is held annually on this date.

The main patronal feast is held in honor of San Nicolás de Tolentino, patron saint of the city, and takes place during the first days of September. All the events take place in the atrium of the Church and ex-convent of San Nicolás de Tolentino. Pilgrimages from different localities gather there and various religious ceremonies are held; the main day of the celebration is September 10.

Throughout the year, patronal feasts are held in honor of the saint of each of the parishes in the city's colonies. In the Los Olivos colony, in the northern part of the city, on October 28, a small fair is held in honor of St. Jude Thaddeus, with various cultural and sporting events. Also in the Guadalupe colony there is a fair in honor of the Virgin of Guadalupe on December 12. In the Cañada Chica Aviación colony, a fair in honor of Teresa of Ávila is held on October 15.

In the Pozo Grande colony a fair is held in honor of the Virgin of Guadalupe on December 12. Also in Pozo Grande there is a fair on June 21 where the Sacred Heart of Jesus is celebrated, with activities such as the barril encebado, roosters, jaripeo, exhibitions, fireworks, processions through the main streets of the colony, and masses.

==== Easter ====
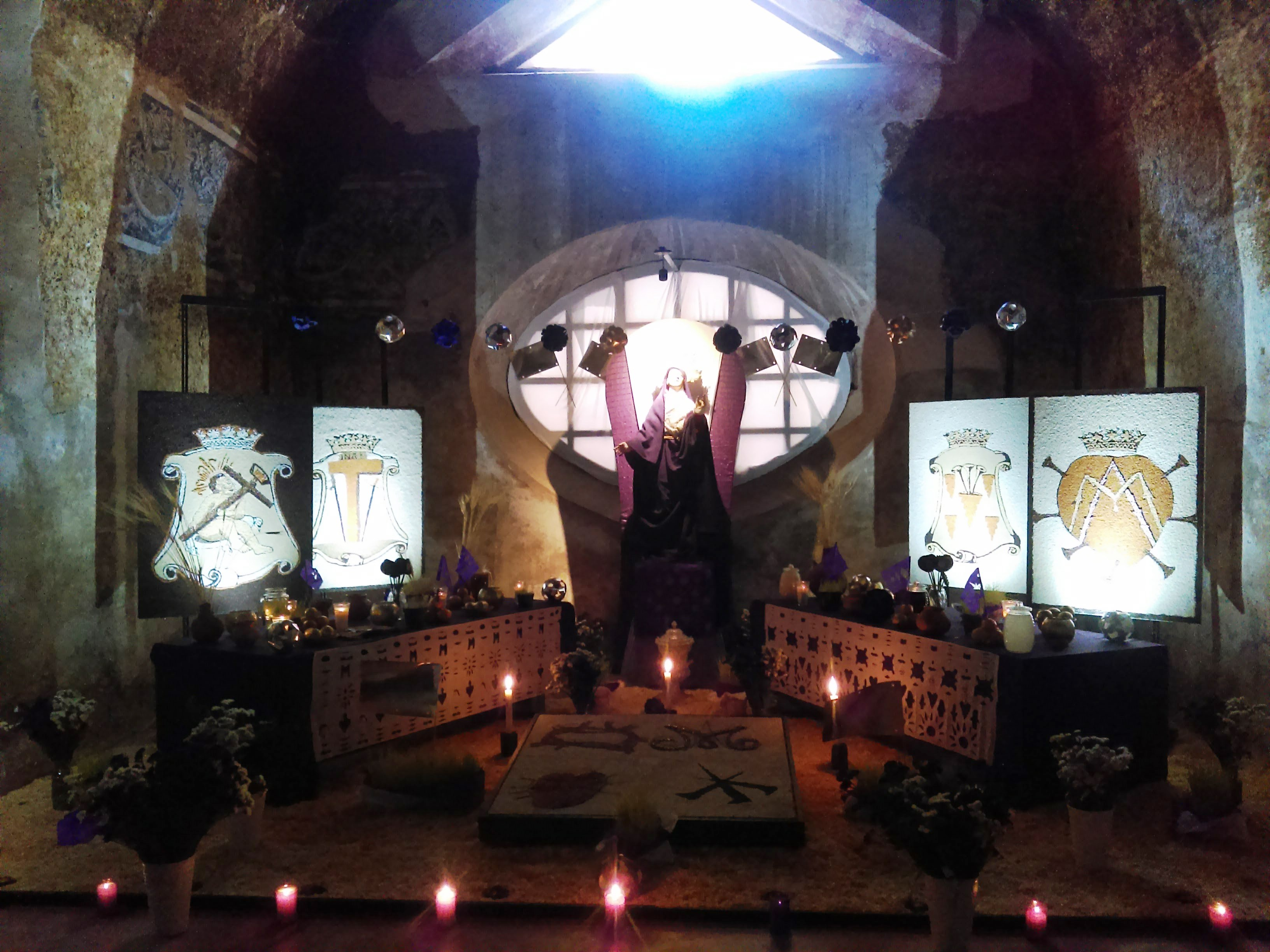
Altar of Sorrows (2018).

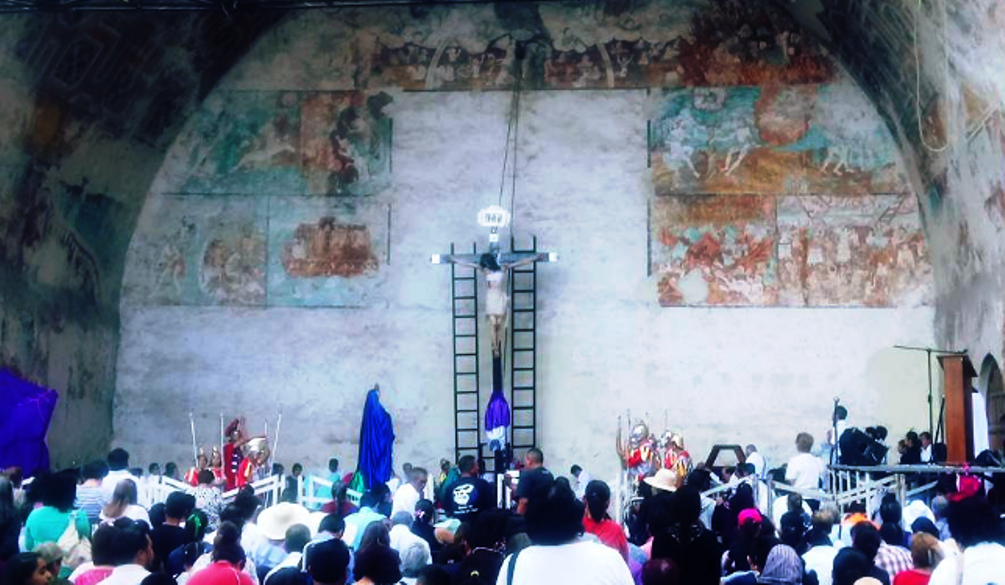
Stations of the Cross on Good Friday.

On Friday of Sorrows, inside the Church and ex-convent of San Nicolás de Tolentino, an Altar of Sorrows is placed in honor of the Our Lady of Sorrows. This Mexican tradition dates back to the 17th century. In it is placed a sculpture carved in polychrome wood of the 19th century, in the highest and central part. The altar is accompanied by lighted candles or sirios that allude to the seven sorrows of the Virgin and the light of God. Frontals and mats are also made of painted sawdust, flower petals and seeds, to recreate the instruments of the Passion; likewise, fragrant herbs, such as chamomile, are placed on them. Spheres are hung and assembled using the modular origami technique, with purple and gold paper.

During Easter there is a procession and mass on Palm Sunday, in the streets of the center of the town that ends with a mass in the open chapel of the Church and ex-convent of San Nicolás de Tolentino. On Holy Thursday there is a mass and representation of the Last Supper and the washing of the feet performed by Jesus. On Good Friday a procession commemorating the Way of the Cross and the crucifixion of Jesus of Nazareth takes place through the streets of the city beginning and culminating in the open chapel of the Church and ex-convent of San Nicolás de Tolentino. Also in the afternoon there is a Procession of Silence in honor of the Our Lady of Solitude. This procession takes place through the main streets of downtown starting at the Church and ex-convent of San Nicolás de Tolentino. On Holy Saturday a mass of the Easter Vigil, Sign of the Risen Christ, is held in the open chapel of the Church and ex-convent of San Nicolás de Tolentino.

Masses and processions are also held in the different churches of the city. As in the Pozo Grande colony, where since 2006 a Passion, Death and Resurrection of Jesus of Nazareth is held in the main streets of the neighborhood.

==== Day of the Dead ====
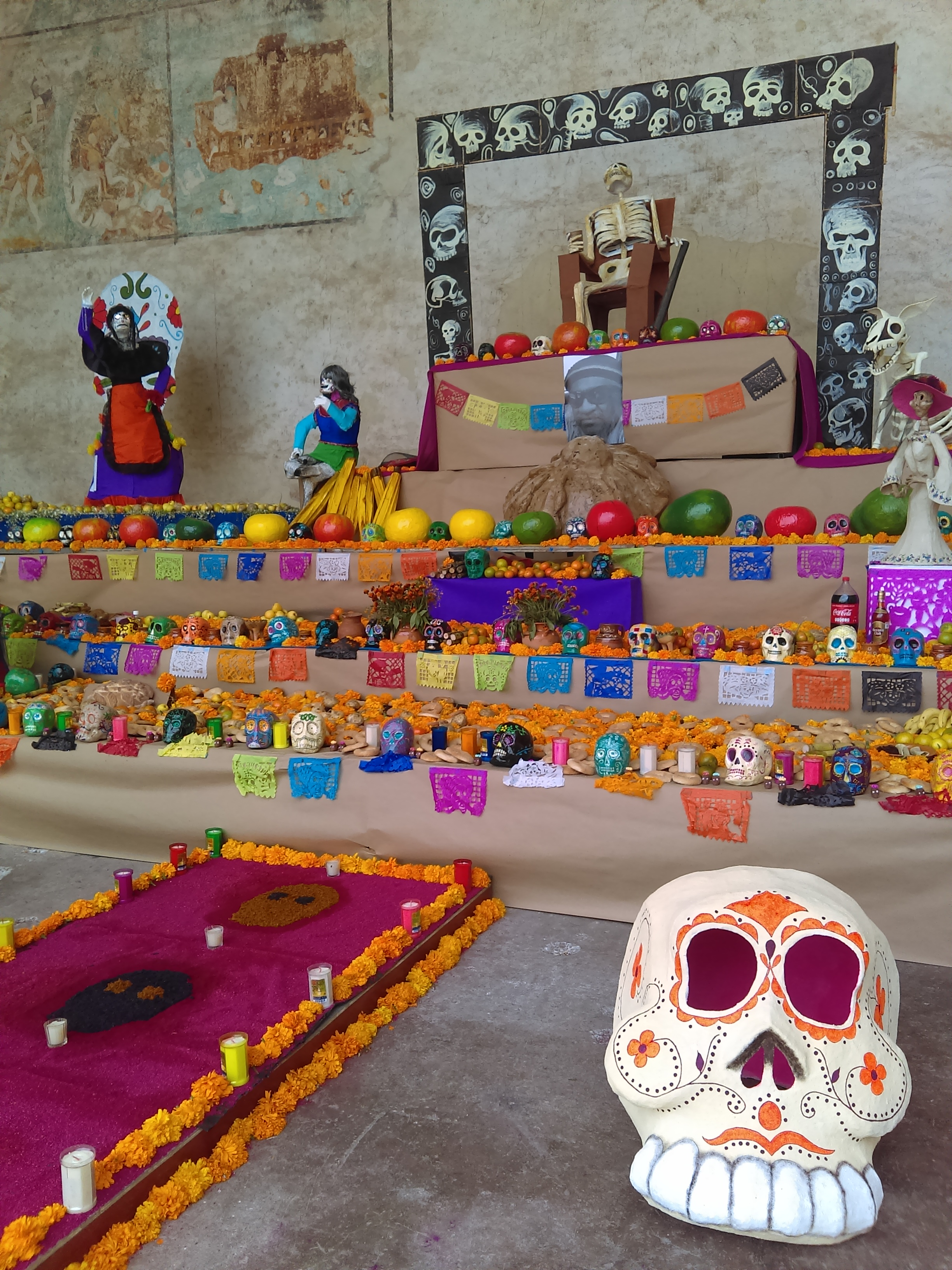
Day of the Dead Altar in 2018.

Another tradition of great importance is the celebration of the Day of the Dead, in which some people place an Ofrenda in their homes, which is composed of seasonal fruit, typical foods of the region and cempasúchil flowers. They also take flowers to the cemetery on November 1 and 2. In the city during these dates a tianguis is set up dedicated to the sale of calavera de alfeñique, pan de muerto, papel picado, fruit, candles, copal and incense, among other things. Different cultural programs are also held on this date, mainly an exhibition of altars.

Among the Otomi of the Mezquital Valley, the offering is composed of an earthen floor, two lateral walls of reeds and a central one made of maguey stalks. It is customary to elaborate structures based on tables and boxes, covered with tablecloths and embroidered napkins. Once these "basamentos" are built, the offerings are placed on them. When the "basamentos" are not assembled, the families usually make "tendidos", either with petates or some other propitious element, and in them they place fruits, flowers, food, as well as candles and copal.

==== Christmas Holidays ====
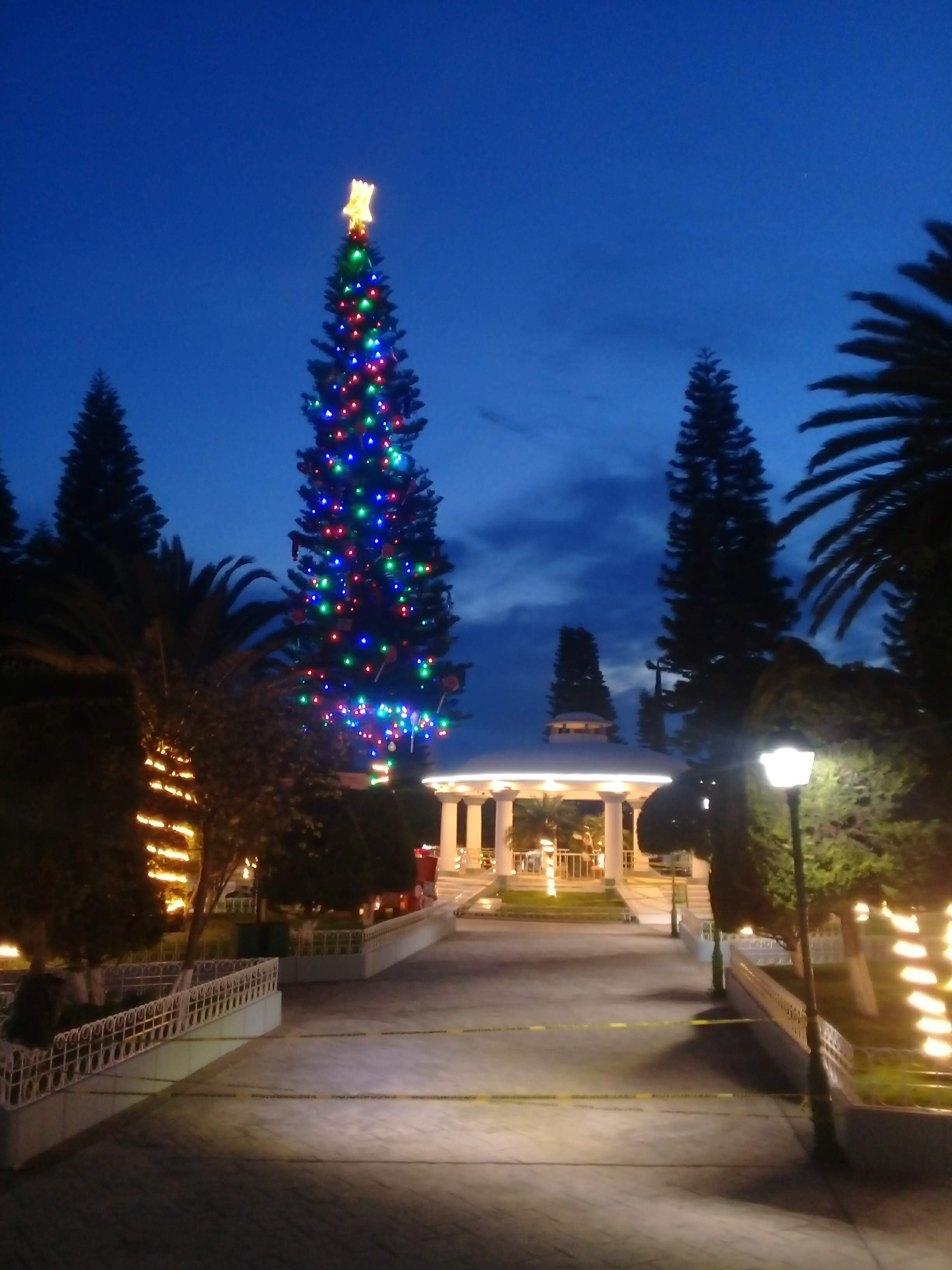
Christmas tree in 2020.

During the month of December, the so-called Fiestas Decembrinas (Christmas Holidays) are held, when the city's Christmas tree is lit, which is an average of 12 meters high. This Christmas tree has been in place since 2009. During the lighting there are fireworks, music, representations of different stories about Christmas, and villancicos. On December 12, the traditional celebrations to Our Lady of Guadalupe are held with multiple pilgrimages, fireworks and masses. Las Posadas ( December 16 to 24), Christmas, New Year's Eve and New Year are also celebrated.

On January 5, a toy tianguis is placed in the streets of downtown. In addition, since 2012 in the month of January there is a Cavalcade of Magi, this parade includes fireworks, floats decorated with different children's stories, the main one being the one that transports the Three Magi. Along with the Fiestas Decembrinas, the Guadalupe-Reyes Marathon takes place, a concept of Mexican culture that refers to the period from December 12 to January 6, for a total of twenty-six days of festivities.

==== Actopan Fair ====
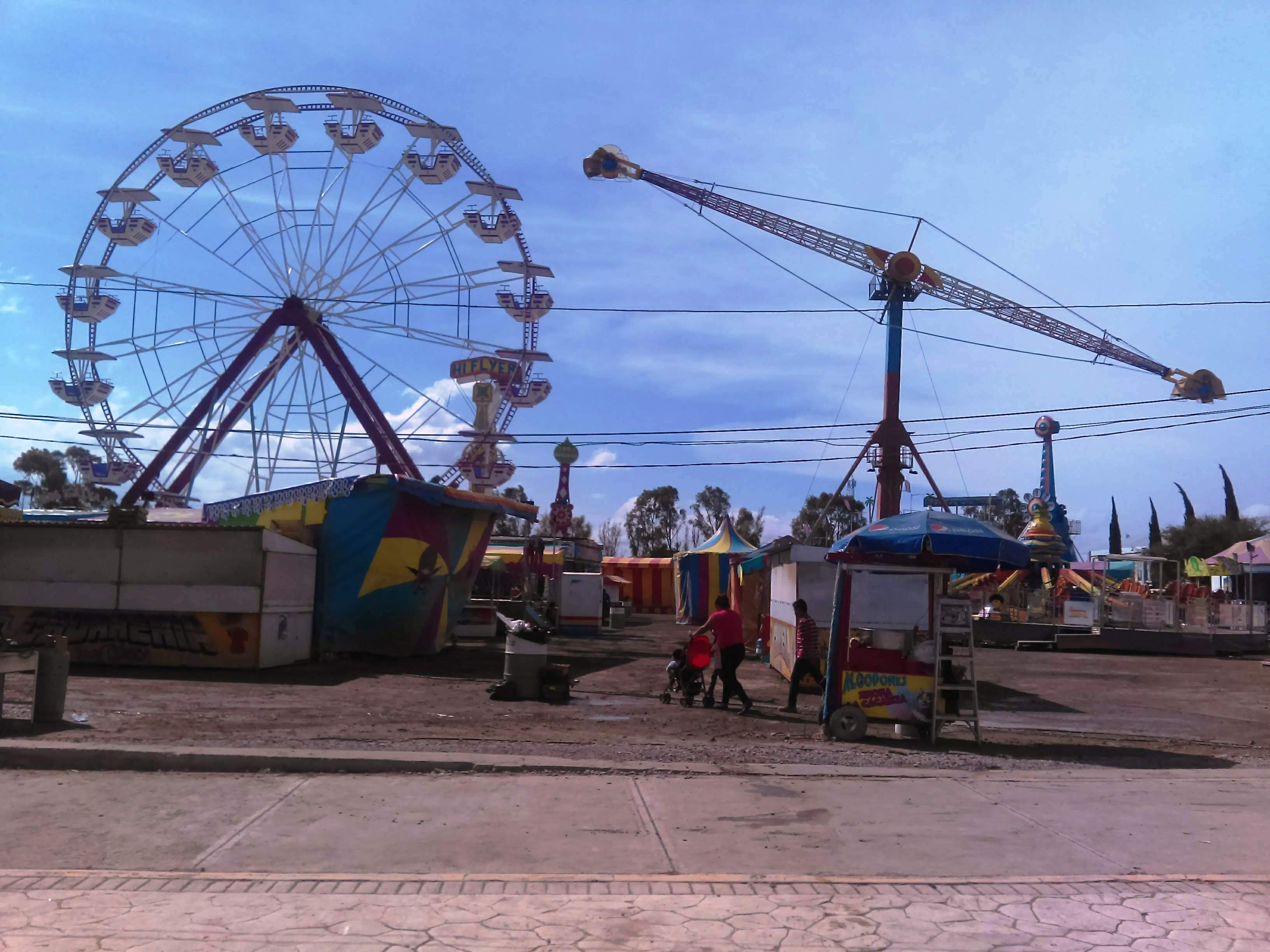
Mechanical games, in 2018.

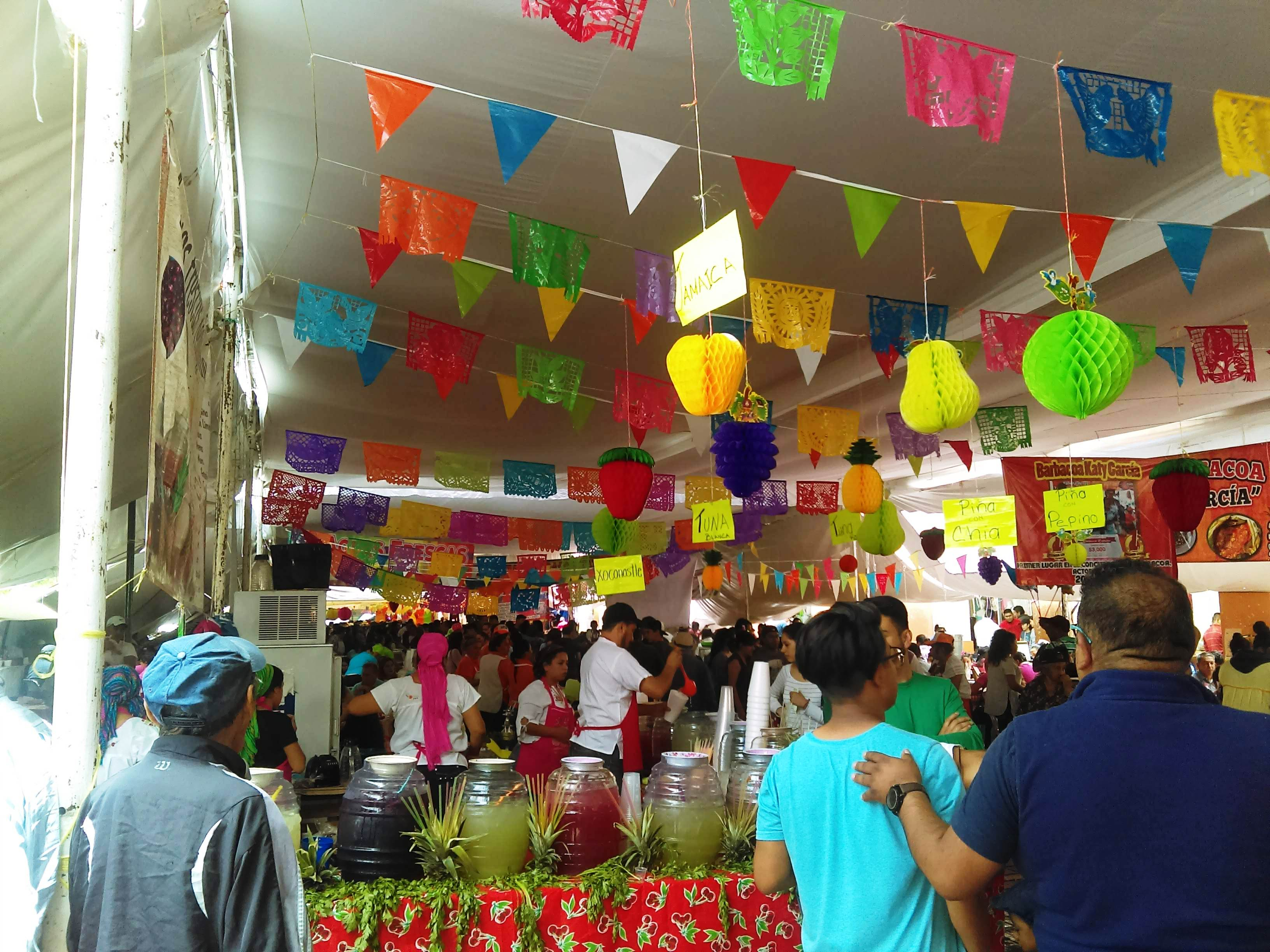
Gastronomic Exhibition, in 2018.

The Actopan Fair, also called Feria de la Barbacoa, is held annually at the beginning of July. Since 1949, the official holiday is July 8, date taken as the day of the founding of the city in 1546. The fair is held at the Unidad Deportiva Municipal (Municipal Sports Unit) located in the northeastern part of the city, and some activities are held in the so-called city center; it receives approximately 130,000 to 150,000 visitors, considering all the events.

Sports activities and cultural events are held, as well as dances, charreadas and a commemorative parade; as well as plays, music bands, painting exhibitions, antique car shows, circus performances, Lucha libre; mechanical games are also installed and fireworks are burned. The food festival stands out with an exhibition and sale of food. The barbacoa contest has been held since 1971 and the Ximbó Festival has been held since 2017.

=== Handicrafts and traditional costumes ===
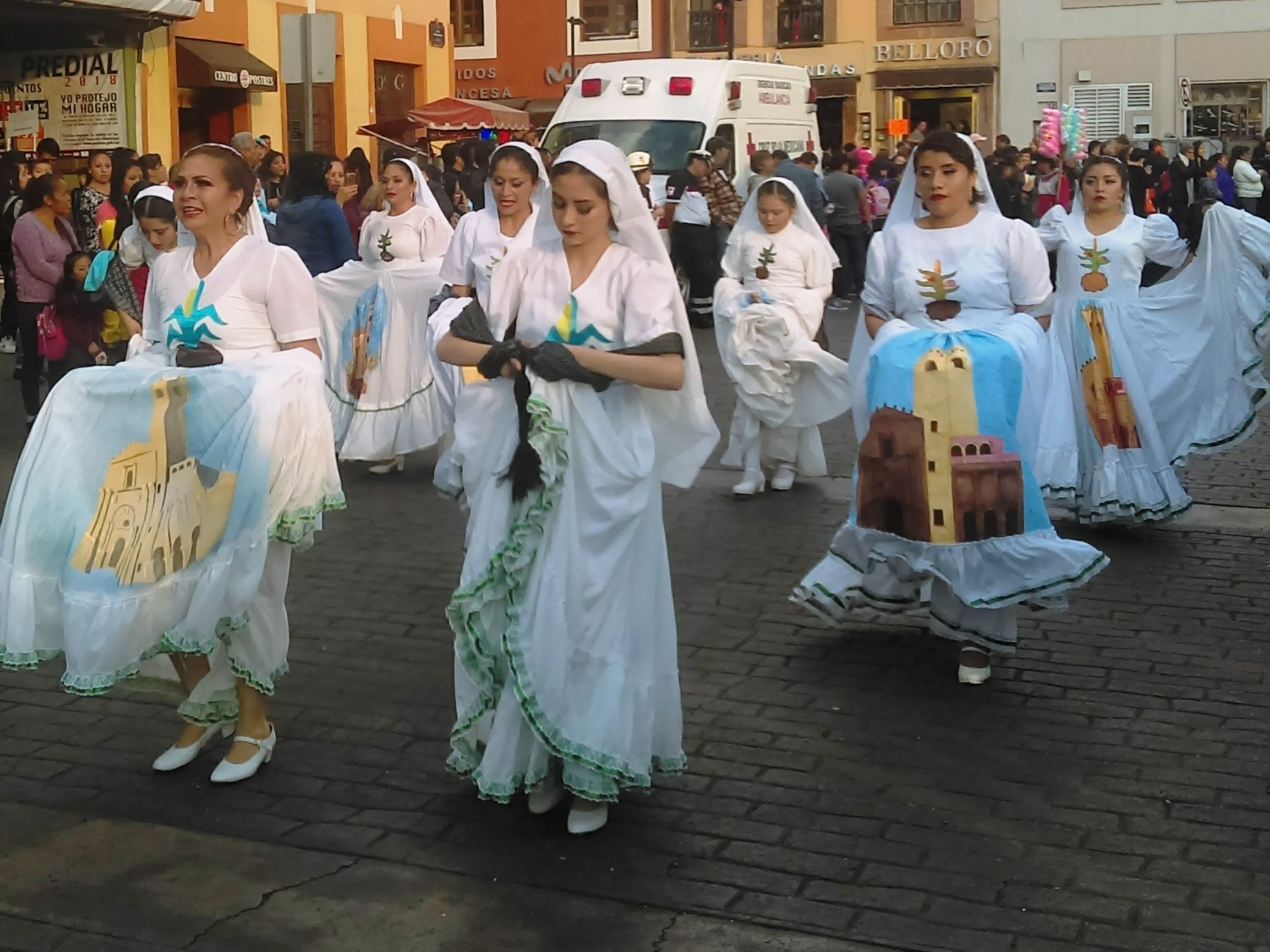
Traditional costume of Actopan.

In the city, embroidery is made on fabric with techniques such as cross stitch and frayed. In basketry, baskets, hats and backpacks are created using palm as raw material. Saddlery is also made, as well as ceramic and pottery works.

For the folk costume is designated the costume used in the folkloric dance: "Actopan Ciudad de Cara Bonita", with choreography and costume design by Abel Pérez Ángeles, Eleuterio Acosta Zúñiga and Teresa León Lopéz. In this dance the color white predominates, for the women the set is made of satin, the skirt with the image of the ex-convent of Actopan stands out, with a 25 cm long skirt, finished with green lace; the white blouse with the image of the glyph of Actopan. The outfit is finished with a shawl and white shoes. For men it is shirt and pants with "pepenado" embroidery (Otomí embroidery, representing the Nahui Ollin). Accompanied with a sombrero de dos pedradas and white boots.

The folk costume of the Mezquital Valley is of Otomí origin; the men used to wear blanket breeches and blanket shirt with some embroidered fabrics, palm hat and huaraches. The women's costume consists of a blanket blouse, embroidered ribbon, rebozo of ayate thread, skirt of colored or white blanket fabric, hair ribbon and glass earrings.

=== Gastronomy ===
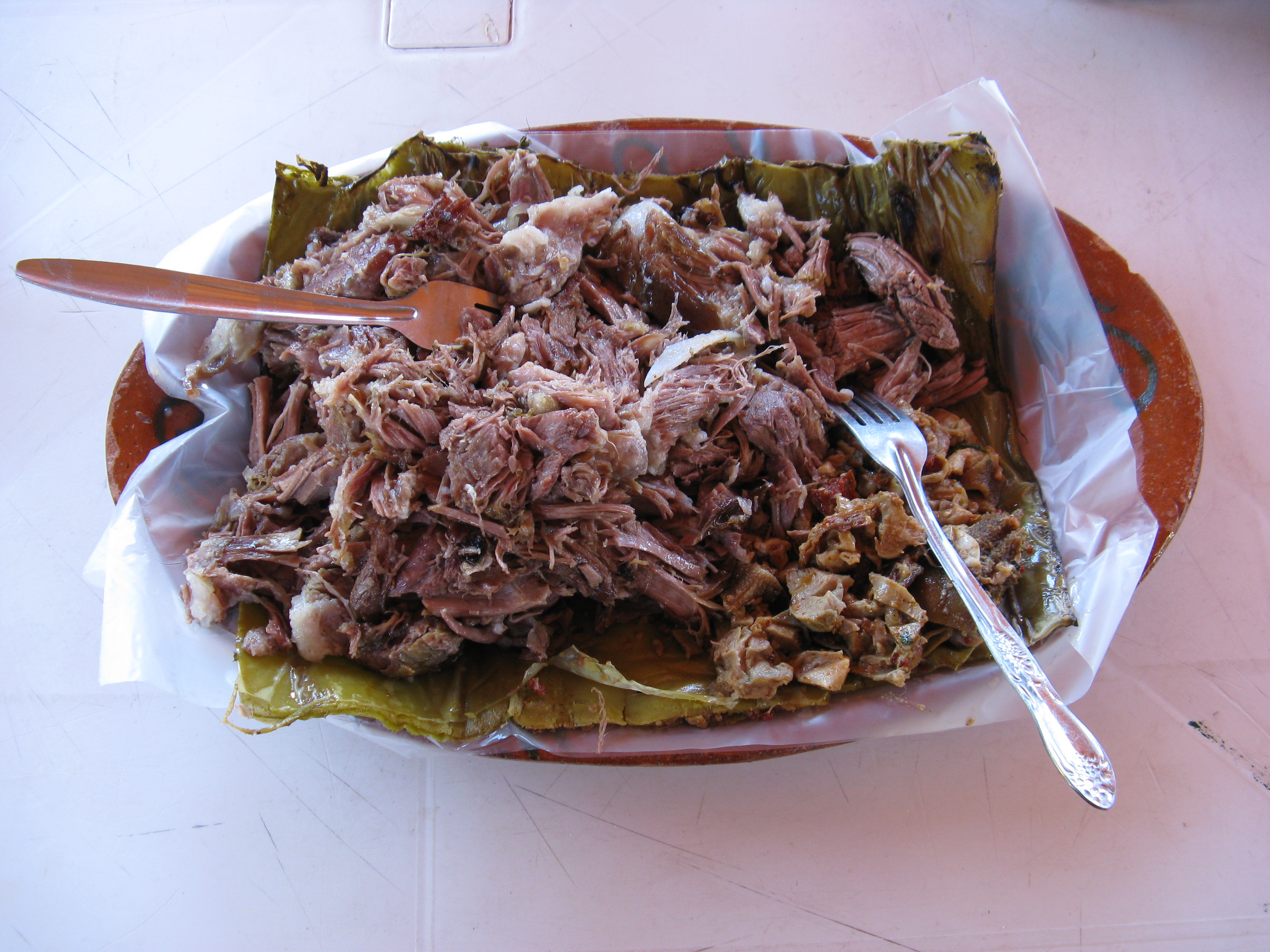
Barbacoa de Borrego, a typical dish of the city.

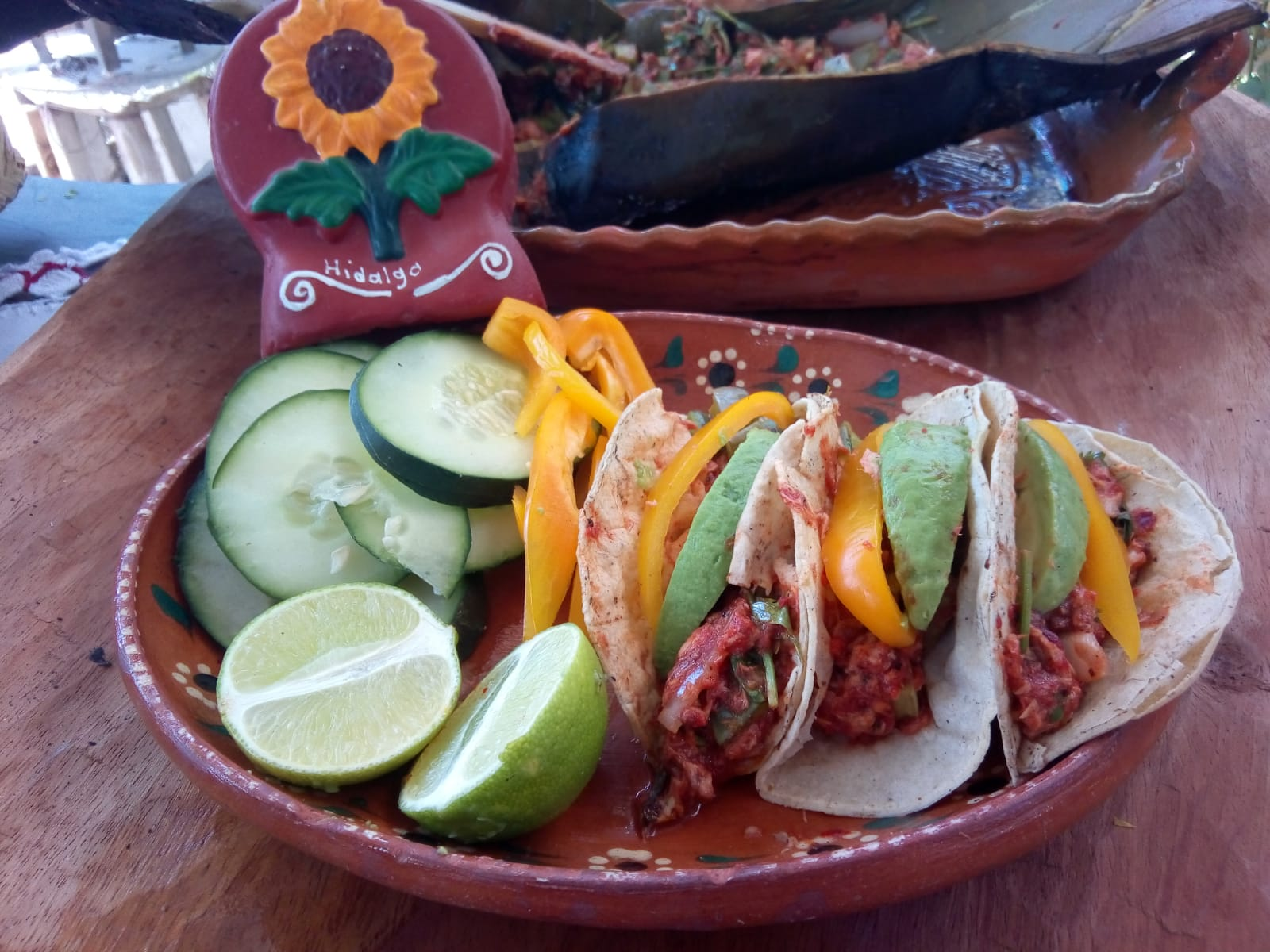
Ximbo tacos, another typical dish of the city.

In gastronomy, the traditional dish is barbacoa baked in a subway oven and wrapped in Maguey stalks, made with beef, lamb and goat meat. In the beginning, it was made with dogs of the xoloitzcuintle breed, as well as other animals. It was not until some time after the arrival of the Spaniards that lamb began to be used.

Also as one of its main dishes is the ximbo, also known as "chicken on a stalk"; this dish was first commercialized in the 1990s. The dish consists of rooster or hen meat wrapped with maguey stalks and baked in a subway oven; it also has nopales, pork skin, chamorro or pork ribs and even veal.

Also from the Mezquital Valley come tunas and xoconostle (sour tunas with syrup or jam) for dessert; escamoles and chinicuiles stewed with flowers of different cacti, such as maguey, aloe, mesquite, bilberry cactus, nopal; chamuis (mesquite tree beetles); xagis (tender beans with pork and pasilla chili) and mixiotes. The typical drink is pulque, as well as maguey syrup; the latter is the first thing that is extracted from the maguey; later, when fermented, it results in pulque, from which the curado beverages are derived. Other typical dishes and foods are: chalupas, pambazos, tacos, mixiotes, mole, tlacoyos, sopes, quesadillas and gorditas.

== Infrastructure ==
=== Transportation ===
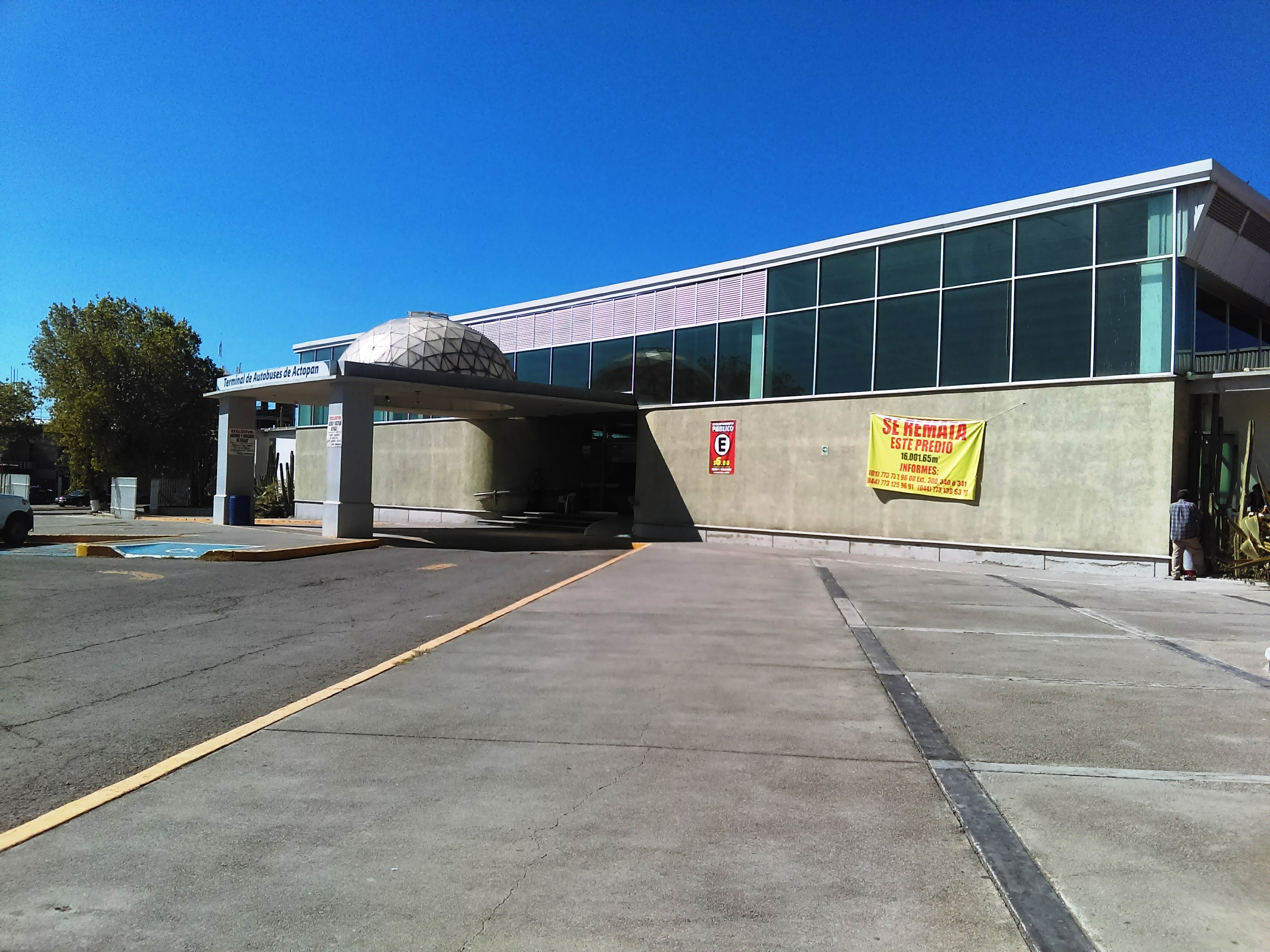
Terminal de Autotransportes de Actopan "Antonio Mejía Gandolffi".

Federal Highway 85 Mexico-Laredo is the main road in the city, allowing for the distribution and exchange of goods and services. It connects to the Actopan-Tula highway, one of the most important highways in the state. In addition, the city has the Bulevar Oriente (East Boulevard), which functions as a beltway allowing a faster transfer of tourism and commerce to Mexico City or Nuevo Laredo.

The city has a bus terminal; the Terminal de Autotransportes de Actopan "Antonio Mejía Gandolffi" (TAAC). Domestic destinations include Mexico City; Monterrey, Nuevo León; Santiago de Querétaro, Querétaro; Reynosa, Tamaulipas; Guadalajara, Jalisco; Ciudad Valles, San Luis Potosí; and destinations within the state of Hidalgo such as Pachuca, Ixmiquilpan, Zimapán, Tulancingo and Tula de Allende.

=== Media and communications ===
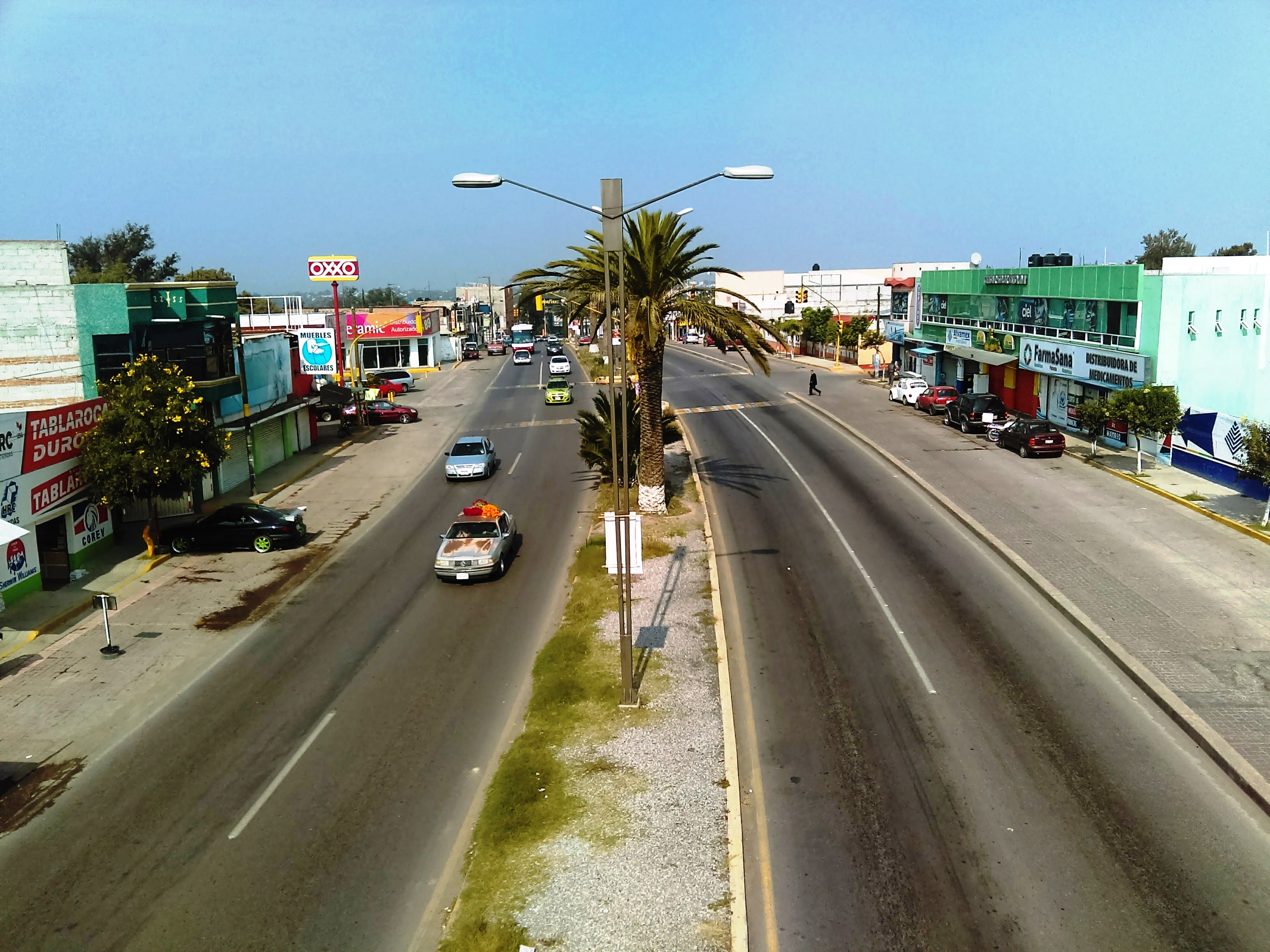
Federal Highway 85 passing through the city.

As for media, it has Internet, telephone network and mobile telephony. The television signal arrives by cable and open signals such as Televisa and TV Azteca; it also receives the signal of the state channel: Channel 3 Hidalgo.

The city has a radio signal, Radio UAEH Actopan (XHPECW-FM), being the fifth station that makes up the University System of Radio and Television of the UAEH; which began activities on February 26, 2019. There was also Radio Actopan (XHACT-FM), which operated under the command of Radio y Televisión de Hidalgo; it began operations on November 29, 2010, and ended on November 28, 2022.

The city has a Postal Administration of Correos de México, a public space connected to the México Conectado Program and a Digital Community Center. The postal code of the town is 42500, and its telephone prefix is 772.

=== Education ===
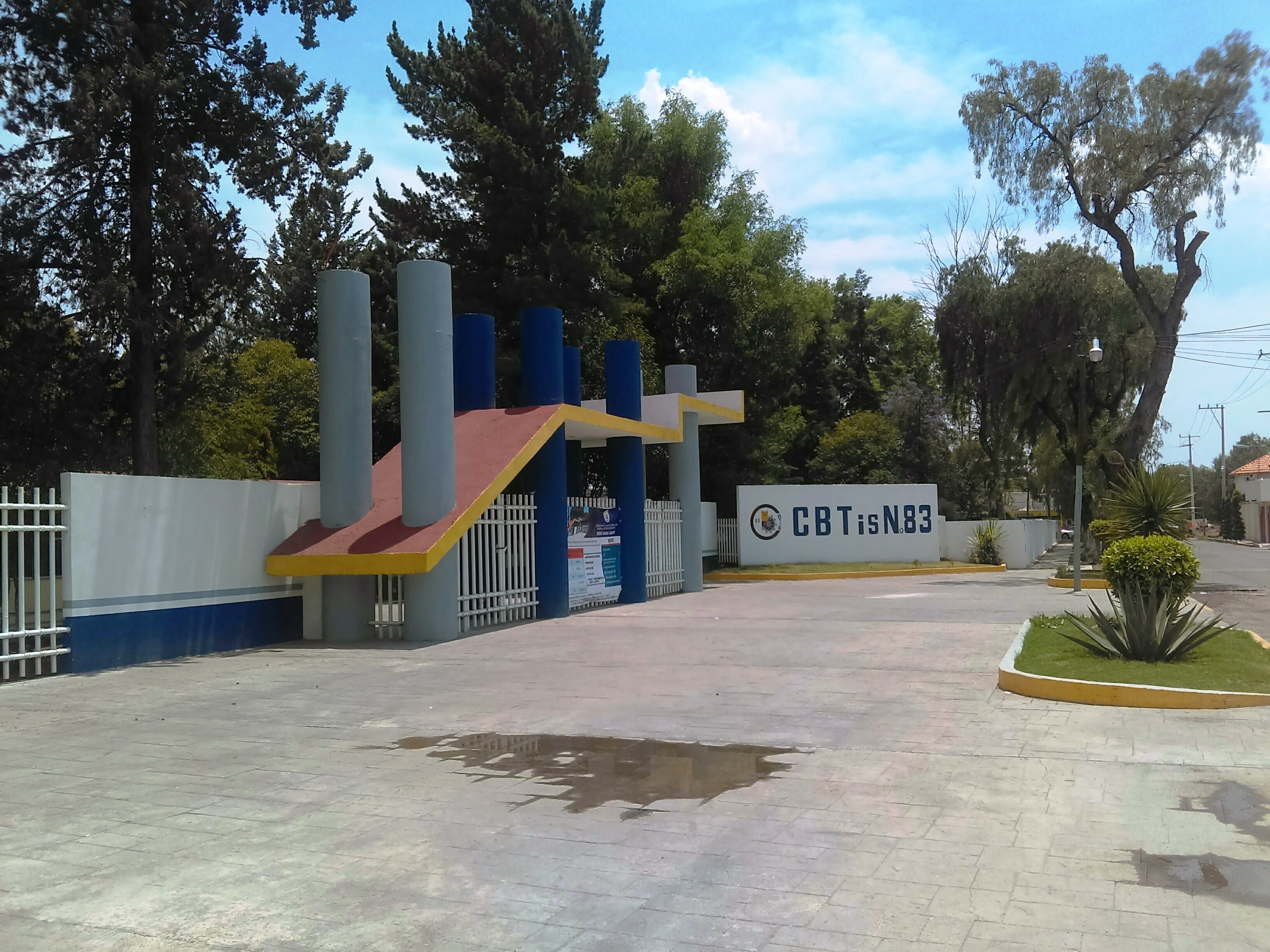
Centro de Bachillerato Tecnológico Industrial y de Servicios No. 83. "Pedro María Anaya Álvarez".

The illiterate population is 4.07%; (Note: Percentage of population aged 15 and over.) and the population with incomplete basic education is 30.16%. For the 2018–2019 school year, (Note: For statistical purposes, morning and afternoon shifts are considered two different schools; as institutions with multiple educational levels are counted separately.) kindergarten and/or nursery education has twelve schools, 24 teachers and 505 students; preschool education has twenty-three schools, 87 teachers and 1762 students; primary education has twenty-four schools, 223 teachers and 5280 students; secondary education has eleven schools (eight general, two telesecundaria and one technical), 116 teachers and 3083 students; higher secondary education has ten schools (three technological and seven general).

In higher secondary education, the Actopan High School stands out, an institution dependent on the Actopan High School belonging to the UAEH; which began activities in 2014, with a general baccalaureate modality. The Centro de Bachillerato Tecnológico Industrial y de Servicios No. 83 also stands out. "Pedro María Anaya Álvarez", an institution under the Dirección General de Educación Tecnológica Industrial (DGETI), which began operations on September 29, 1975; it has six specialties: Construction, Computer Science, Accounting, Programming, Automotive Maintenance and Computer Equipment Support and Maintenance.

In higher education, there is the Centro de Estudios Universitarios Moyocoyani, Plantel Actopan, with degrees in Pedagogy and Administrative Informatics. There is also the Actopan High School of the Universidad Autónoma del Estado de Hidalgo (UAEH), with degrees in law, Psychology, Graphic Design, and Business Creation and Development. On July 17, 2000, it began operations, its facilities are located in the town of El Daxthá, on the outskirts of the city, occupying an area of 49,364.94 m^{2}, where it houses six modules, a library, two computer areas, a language center, administrative offices, an auditorium, a machine room and a parking lot.

=== Healthcare ===
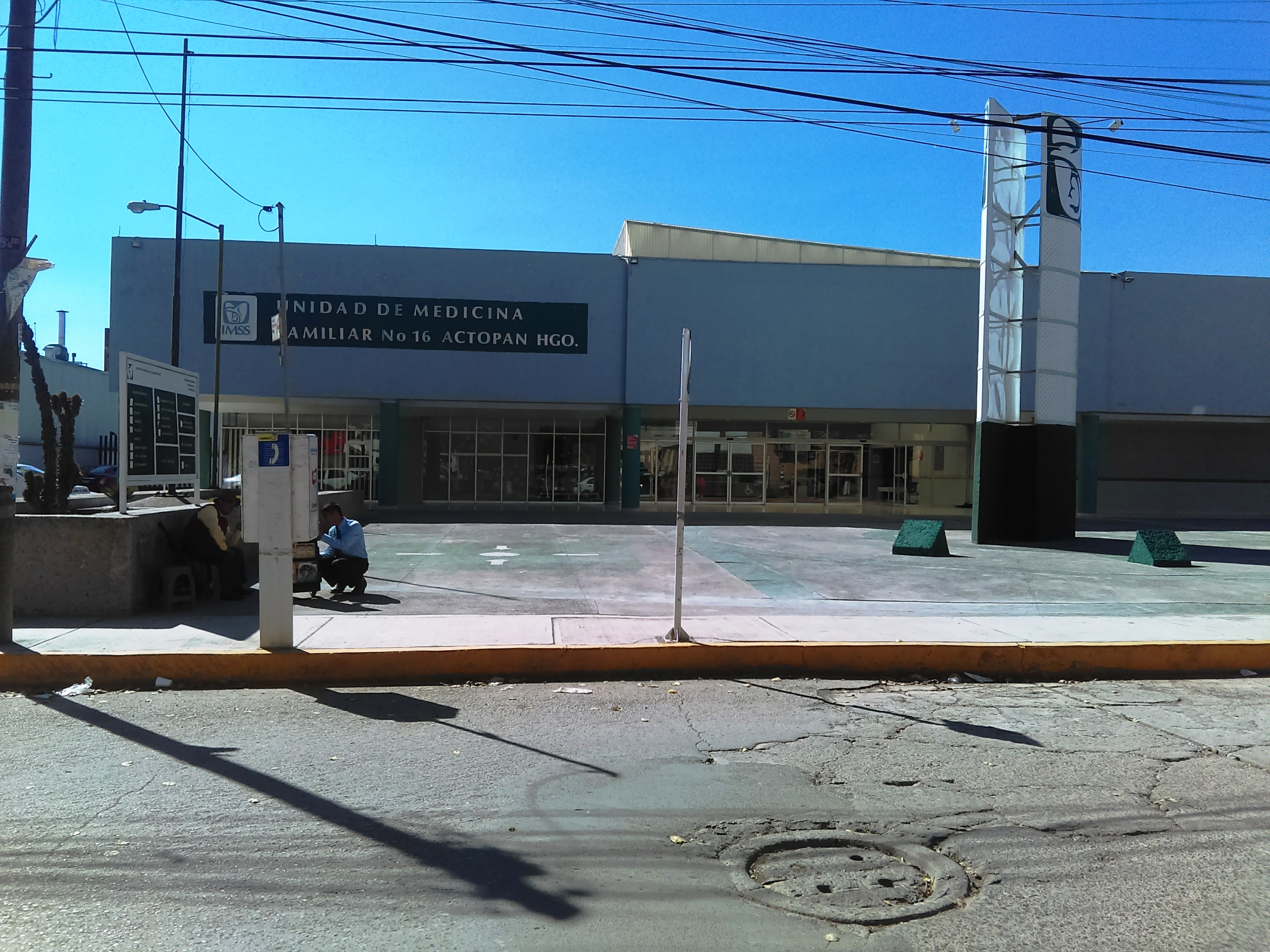
Family Medicine Unit (UMF) No. 16 of the Mexican Social Security Institute.

In the city, 42.06% of the population is not entitled to health services. The city has the Family Medicine Unit (UMF) No. 16 of the Mexican Social Security Institute; the Family Medicine Unit of the Institute for Social Security and Services for State Workers; and a clinic of the Mexican Red Cross. There are also two health centers of the Secretaría de Salud de Hidalgo, one located in the Chapultepec colony and the other in the Cañada Chica Aviación colony.

The Actopan General Hospital was inaugurated in 2000. There are seven outpatient and subspecialty areas; two emergency and gynecology areas; in toco-surgery there is an expulsion room, labor and delivery room and recovery beds; for hospitalization there are thirty census beds with central nurses, neonatology and operating room.

=== Public services ===
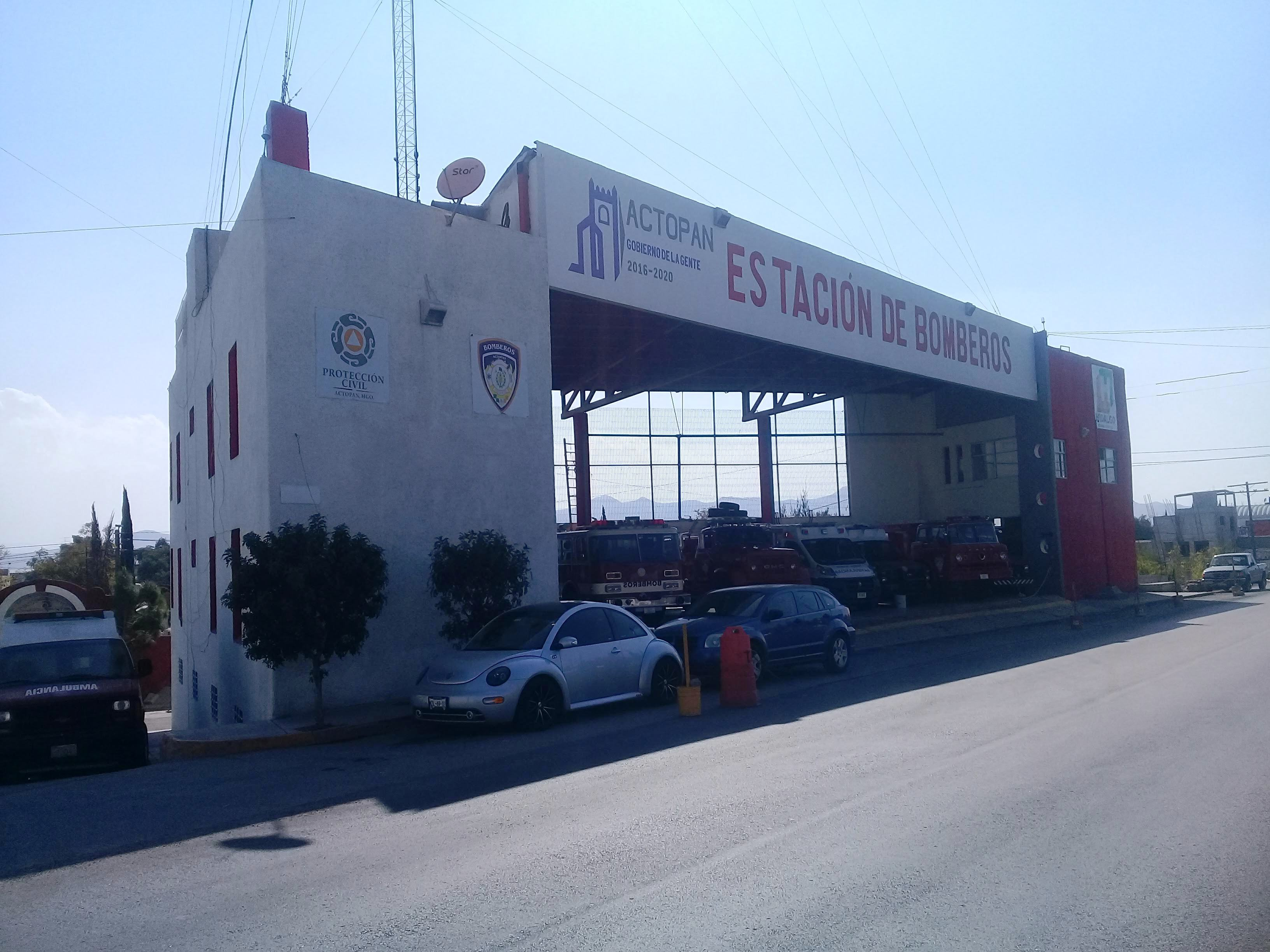
Fire station in Actopan.

Public services are potable water, drainage, and electricity; the availability of these services in the municipality is partially scarce. Drinking water, drainage, and sewerage services are provided by the Comisión de Agua y Alcantarillado Sistema Actopan (CAASA). There are eight water wells to provide service to the population, with a supply of fourteen million liters per day; it is estimated that an Actopan resident uses 205 liters of water per day.

The Comisión Federal de Electricidad (CFE) is in charge of electricity and public lighting. The city has a fire station, In terms of public safety, there is an agency of the Public Prosecutor's Office with ten agents. The city also has a social rehabilitation center (Cereso).

The Actopan landfill is a Type C, (Note: Type C from 10 to 50 tons, classified according to Mexican Official Standard NOM-083-SEMARNAT-2003.) due to the amount of tons that enter daily around 18 to 23 tons. It is 180 meters long by 30 meters wide and 15 meters deep. It is an open-air landfill, it began operations in 2017 and by 2021 it will be at maximum capacity. It has 10 units for garbage collection, covering 14 routes in 25 colonies.

== Economy ==
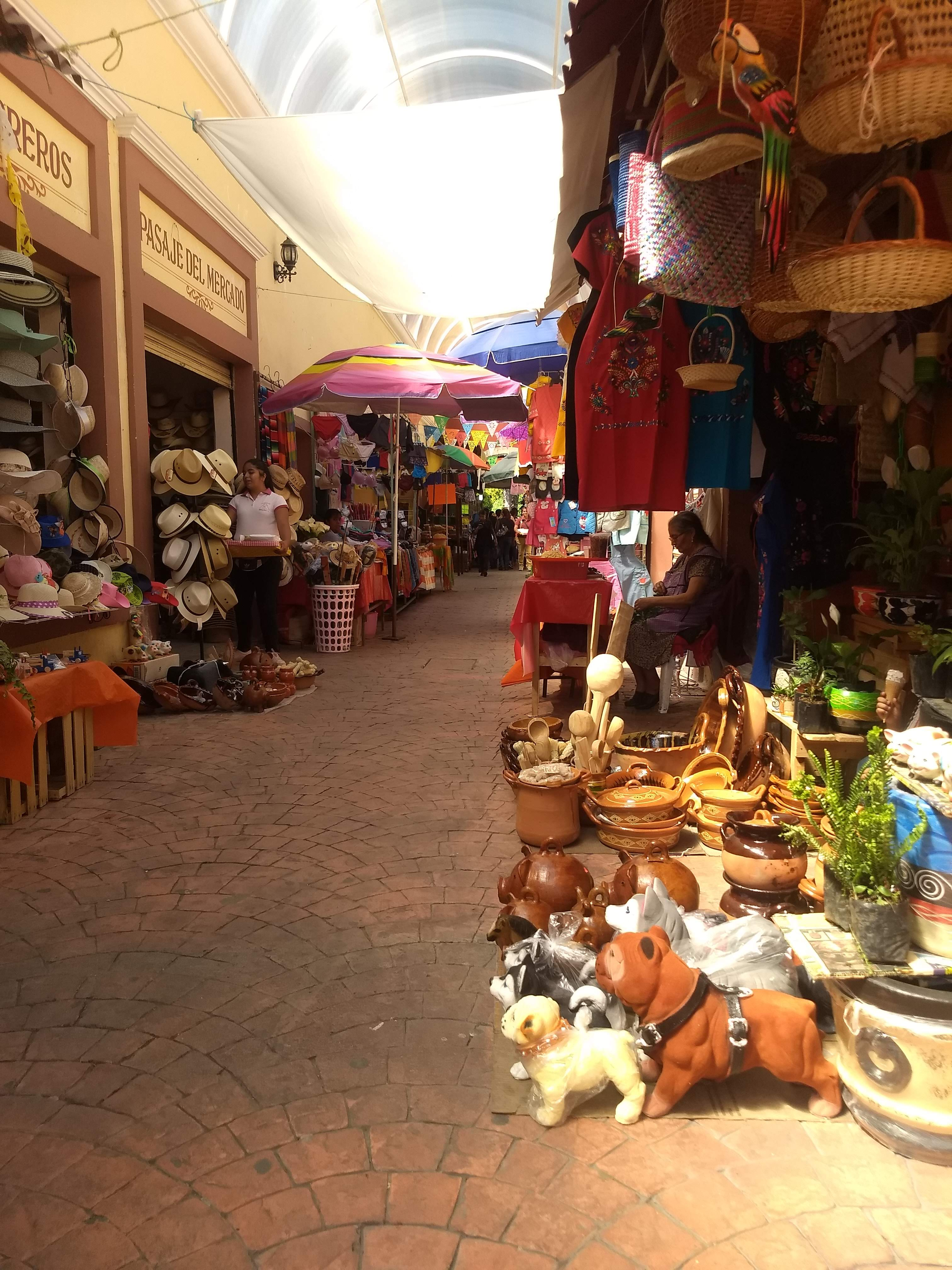
Interior of the 8 de julio Market.

In 2015 it presented a Human Development Index of 0.776 (High). In terms of finance there are nine bank branches, among which are Banamex, BBVA Bancomer, Banco Azteca, HSBC, Bancoppel, Banco Ahorro Famsa. In industry there are small manufacturing companies such as huaraches, bricks for construction, and clothing maquiladoras.

In terms of agriculture and livestock, grazing areas and crops are located in the colonies on the outskirts of the city, such as Cañada Chica Aviación, Cañada Chica, La Estación, El Cerrito, Dos Cerritos and Pozo Grande; these are activities with little production in the city. In agriculture, small-scale production is corn and alfalfa; and in livestock, production is mainly aviculture with poultry.

The city has a slaughterhouse inaugurated in 2015, it has a surface area of 3500 m^{2}; it has administrative areas, loading, unloading, the area of the main warehouse and the corrals, where about eighty herds and twice as many pigs can be slaughtered during eight hours.

=== Trade ===
==== Stores and markets ====
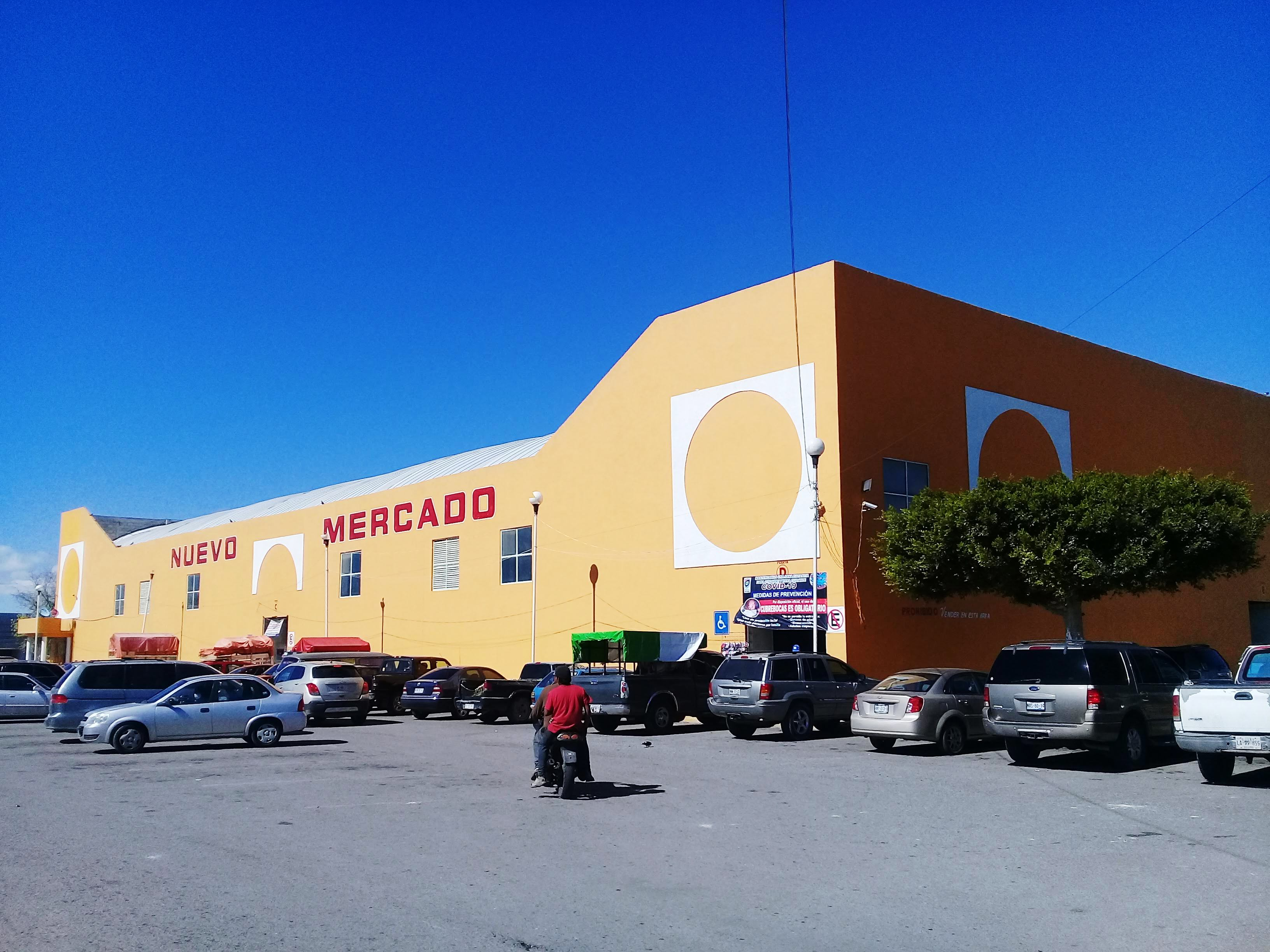
Jamaiquitas Market.

Commerce is located mainly in the city center and in the surrounding streets, especially the sale of clothing, shoes, fruits and vegetables; there are also commercial chains as well as two convenience stores The city has two Diconsa program stores, as well as two Liconsa dairies in the colonies El Cerrito and La Floresta.

The city has two markets: the 8 de Julio Market and the Jamaiquitas Market. The main market in the city is the 8 de Julio Market, it has two levels to house commercial activity and a subway parking lot. It was built in 1965; in 2014 began the remodeling of the market, and the construction of the subway parking, on April 2, 2015, the market was reopened. The Jamaiquitas Market was built in 2008, and has about 30 stores.

==== Tianguis ====
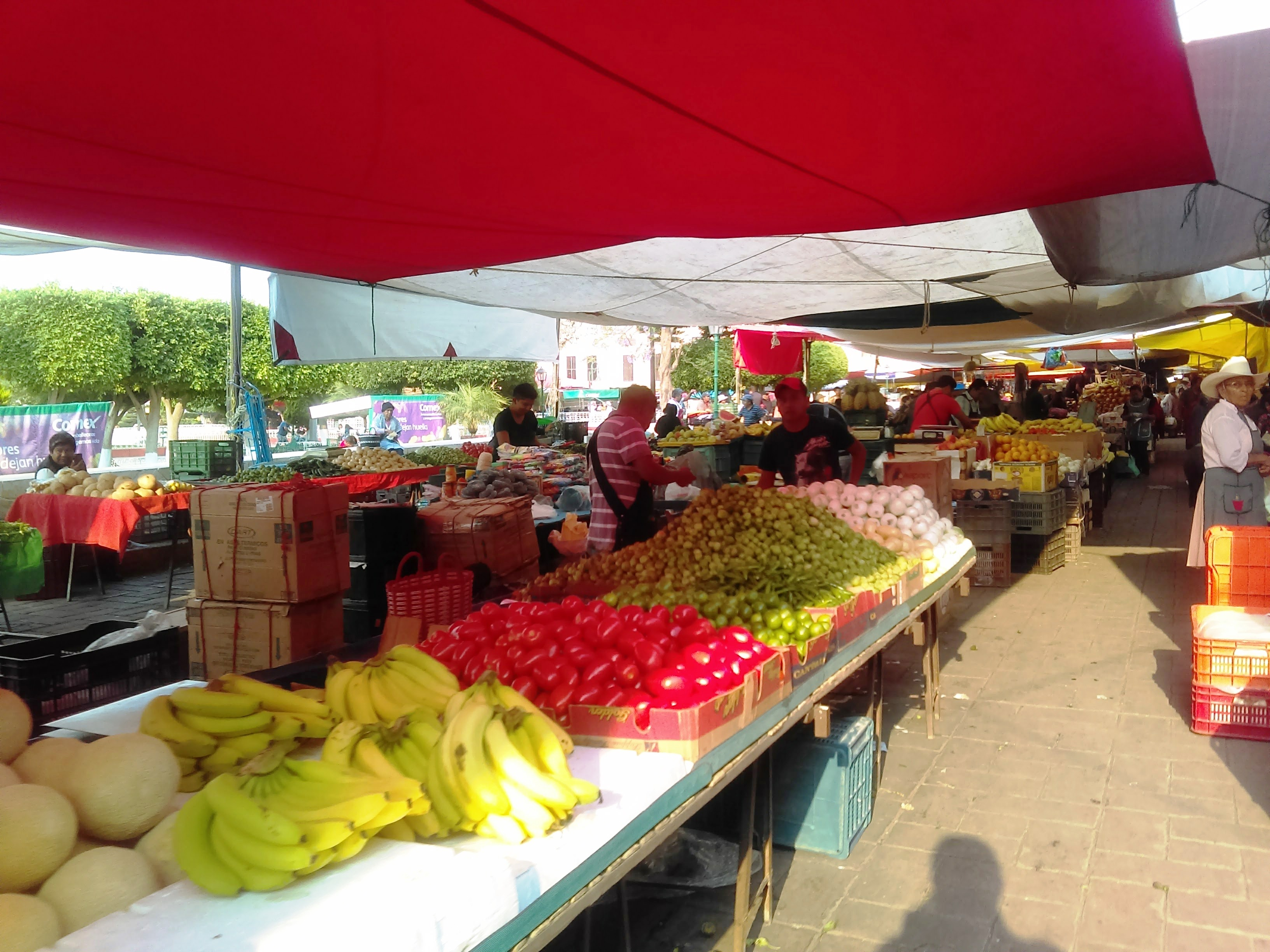
Actopan's Tianguis that takes place every Wednesday.

In the city, tianguis are held on Wednesdays and Sundays. The Wednesday tianguis is one of the most important in the Mezquital Valley. It is located in the so-called center of the city occupying about 45,414 m^{2}, distributed in about twenty-two streets. In it you can find a great variety of merchants offering seasonal fruits, vegetables, legumes, hierbas, stones, lime, kitchen utensils, canned products, seeds, beef, pork, chicken, fish, aluminum cases, clay pots, tools, sweets, clothes, food, etc.

There is no exact date when this tianguis began to be set up, although it is known that sales in the area had been taking place since 1550. Some time later the merchants settled on Efrén Rebolledo Street, since most of the vendors came from Santiago de Anaya. This same street is known for its food stalls, maguey syrup and pulque; and you can listen to mariachi, marimba, huasteco or norteño trios, this area is colloquially known as: Garibaldito.

It is estimated that around twenty-nine thousand people gather every Wednesday to buy products in this tianguis. On Sundays there is another tianguis in the downtown area, this one is smaller than the one on Wednesdays; in it you can find fruits, vegetables, clothes, food, etc. It is located mainly around the Reforma Park where the Actopan Obelisk is located.

==== Food Market ====
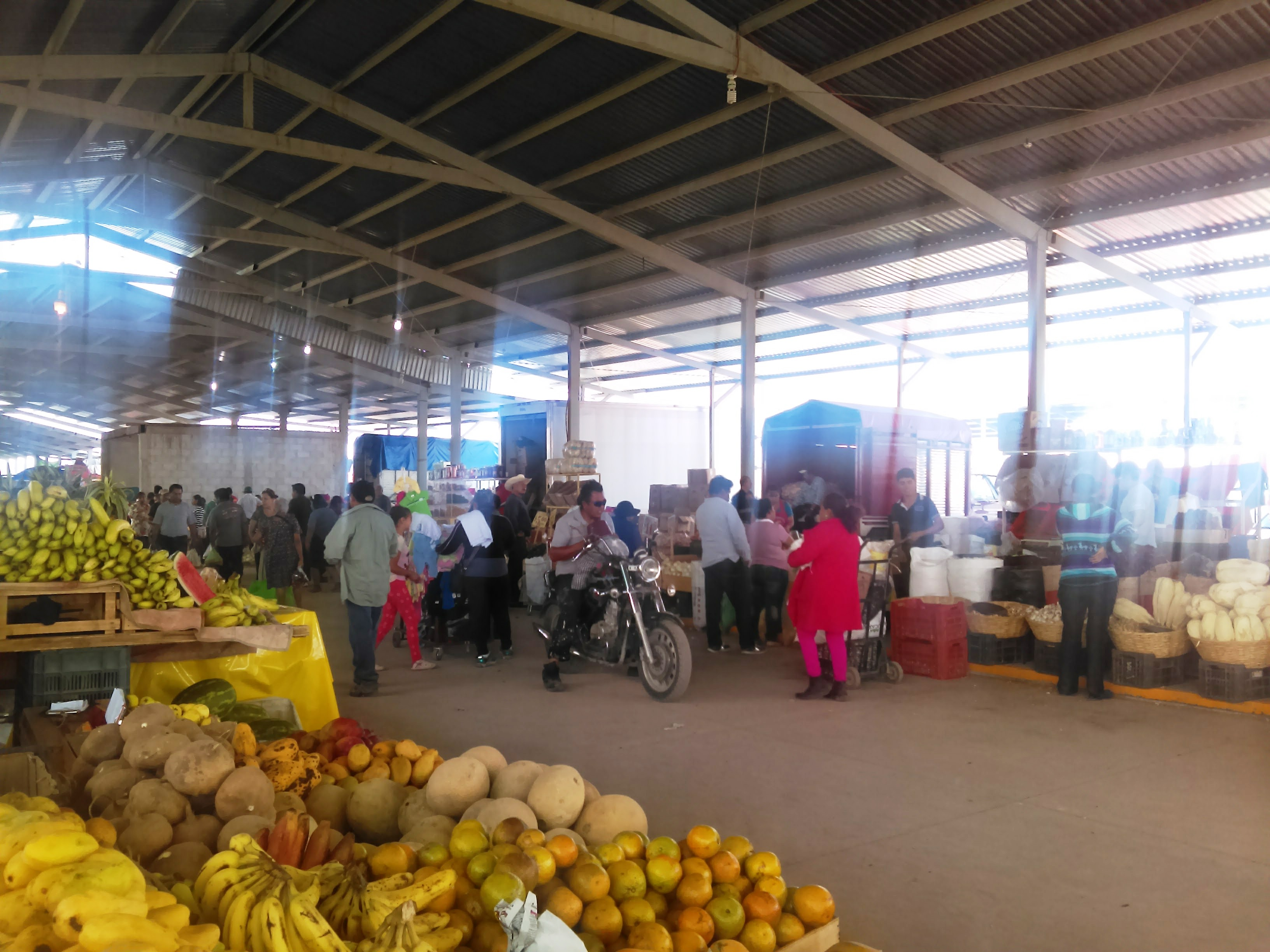
Central de Abastos in Actopan.

The Central de Abastos de Actopan has been in operation since 2005 and only operates on Wednesdays and Saturdays. It is the largest point of commerce in the region, and one of the most important in the state of Hidalgo. On Saturdays it operates with a much smaller number of merchants and offers seasonal fruits, vegetables and legumes.

On Wednesday it functions as an extension of the tianguis that is placed that day in the center of the city. This day hosts approximately five thousand merchants from different municipalities of Hidalgo; in an extension of seventeen hectares.

It has areas for the sale of fodder, livestock (cattle, pigs, sheep and goats) and poultry, groceries, fruit and vegetables (wholesale and retail); as well as an area where electrical appliances, tools, toys, handicrafts, clothing, second-hand items, and others are sold. On this day there is a Gastronomic Pavilion with thirty-nine stores where you can buy typical food of the region. There is also the largest used car market in the state, as it can gather more than five hundred vehicles.

=== Tourism ===
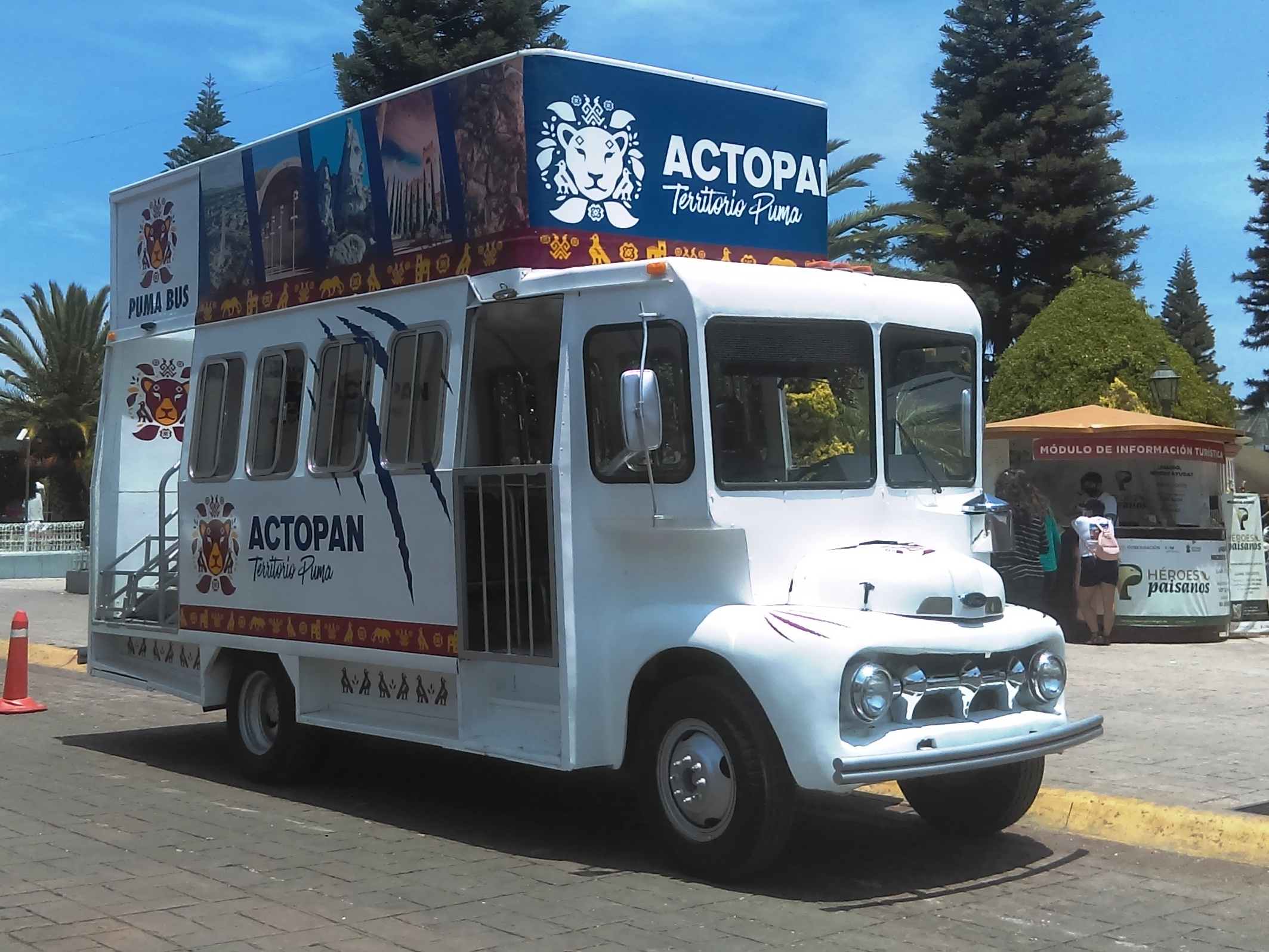
Tourist transportation in Actopan.

The city offers nine four- and three-star hotels, with a total of 258 available rooms; it has sixteen restaurants, three cafeterias, two nightclubs and nine bars. The city is located within the so-called Corredor Turístico de los Balnearios, promoted by the Federal and State Secretariat of Tourism. This corridor passes through the municipalities of Actopan, Santiago de Anaya, Ixmiquilpan, Tasquillo, Tecozautla and Huichapan.

Since November 27, 2011, the city has a tourist transport with capacity for more than thirty people, in its two levels; the second level is open-top. This transportation travels through the main streets and attractions of the city, during the tour the houses where illustrious characters of Actopan lived are shown, such as María del Carmen González, doctor and altruist of the city; Efrén Rebolledo, poet and writer; and Genaro Guzmán Mayer, author of the Hymn to the State of Hidalgo. This transportation does not operate every day, occasionally it only operates on local holidays.

== Sports ==
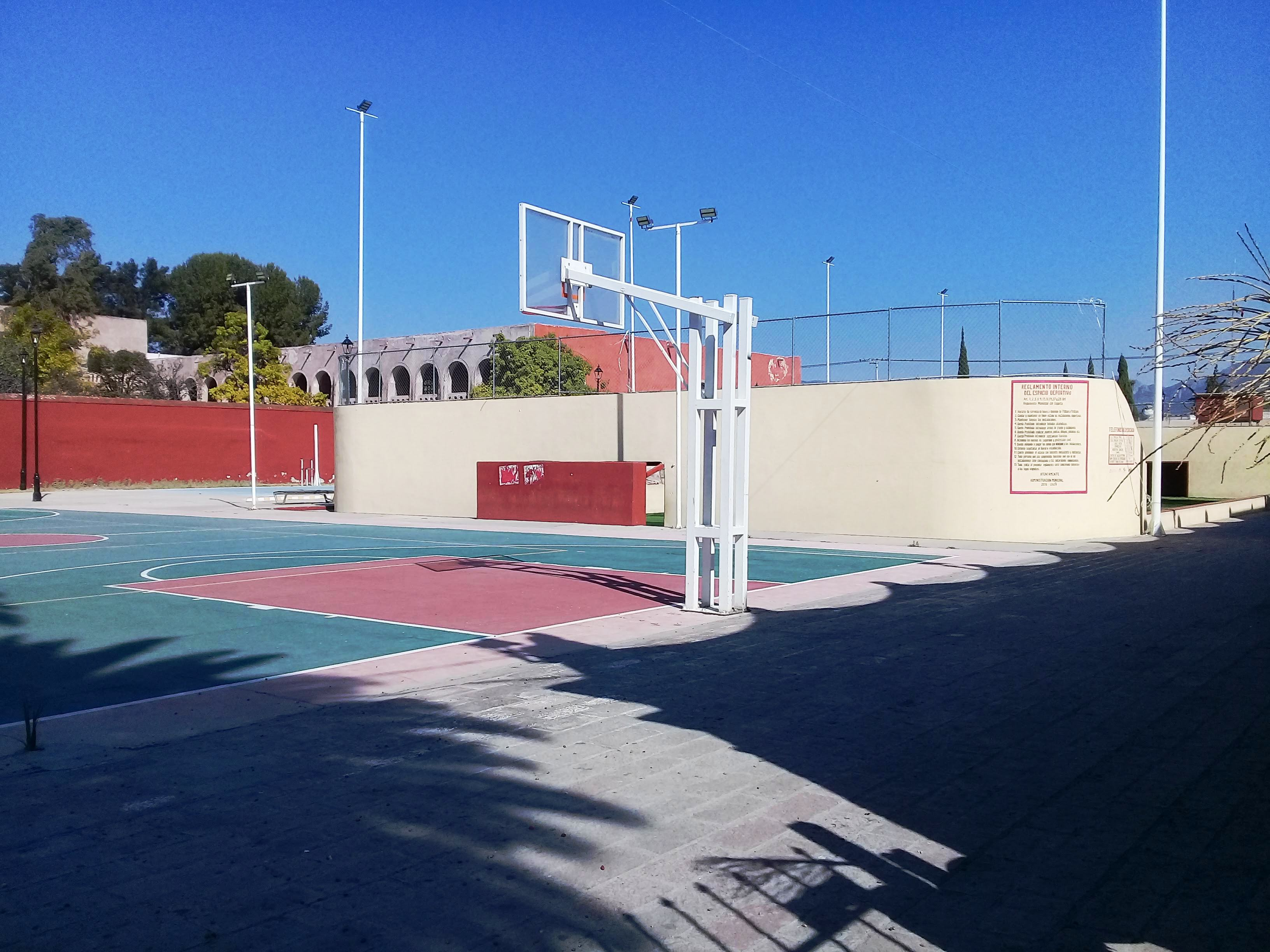
"Las Canchitas" Sports Complex.

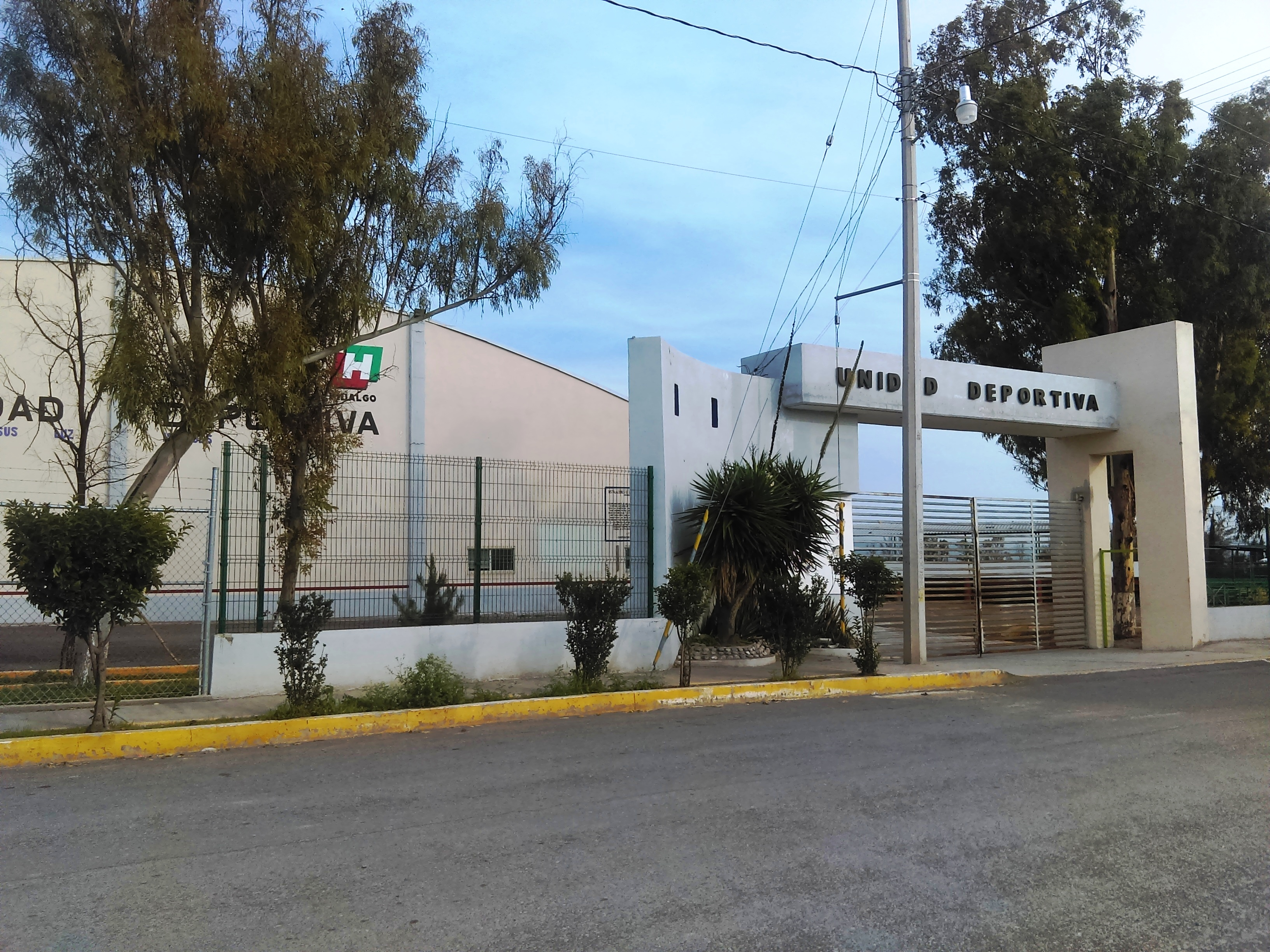
Municipal Sports Complex.

The most popular sport in the city is soccer, followed by football, basketball, baseball, volleyball, cycling, and athletics, among others. In terms of sports infrastructure, there is a football field in the Ozesnos Actopan, as well as a basketball court in the Aviación colony, and a lucha libre arena. There is also a bullring that is also used as a lienzo charro, located near the town of El Daxthá.

In the city there is a lienzo charro called the Centro de Convenciones or Polideportivo "Mañutzi", completely roofed and with a capacity for three thousand people, located within the Municipal Sports Complex. The "Jesús Luz Meneses" Municipal Sports Complex has a gymnasium with volleyball and basketball courts, a baseball field and a fronton court.

The Los Frailes Sports Complex, better known as "El Jagüey", is used as a soccer stadium; it is 105 m long, 57.5 m wide and 3 m deep. The "Las Canchitas" Sports Complex: also known as the "Jesús Luz Meneses" Complex, it has areas for indoor soccer, volleyball and basketball

== See also ==
- Municipalities of Hidalgo

== Bibliography ==
- ADABI (2012). Pérez Hernández, Cristian Eliel; Tolentino Hernández, Homero (eds.). Inventario del Archivo Parroquial de San Nicolás Tolentino, Actopan, Hidalgo, Arquidiócesis de Tulancingo (PDF). Colección Inventarios, núm. 287 (in Spanish) (1st ed.). Mexico: Apoyo al Desarrollo de Archivos y Bibliotecas de México A.C. ISBN 978-607-416-282-0. Archived from the original (PDF) on November 28, 2021.
- Báez Cubero, Lourdes; Garret Ríos, Gabriela; Pérez González, David; Moreno Alcántara, Beatriz; Fierro Alonso, Ulises Julio; Hernández García, Milton Gabriel (2012). Los pueblos indígenas de Hidalgo: Atlas etnográfico (PDF) (in Spanish) (1st ed.). Mexico city: Instituto Nacional de Antropología e Historia. ISBN 978-607-484-357-6. Archived from the original (PDF) on July 25, 2019.
- Ballesteros García, Víctor Manuel (1999). La pintura mural del convento de Actopan (in Spanish) (1st ed.). Pachuca de Soto, Hidalgo: Universidad Autónoma del Estado de Hidalgo. ISBN 968-634-064-5.
- Ballesteros García, Víctor Manuel (2000). Los conventos del estado de Hidalgo : expresiones religiosas del arte y la cultura del siglo XVI (in Spanish) (1st ed.). Pachuca de Soto, Hidalgo: Universidad Autónoma del Estado de Hidalgo. ISBN 968-634-068-8.
- González Torres, Annia (2019). "Fuentes de las instancias locales del gobierno novohispano: los cabildos y la jurisdicción de Actopan, siglo XVIII". Dimensión Antropológica (in Spanish). 76 (26). Mexico city: Instituto Nacional de Antropología e Historia: 95–120.
- INEGI (2004). La Población Hablante de Lengua Indígena de Hidalgo (PDF) (in Spanish). Aguascalientes: National Institute of Statistics and Geography. ISBN 970-13-4420-0. Archived from the original (PDF) on March 4, 2016.
- Jiménez Ricárdez, Rubén (2010). Monografías de municipios hidalguenses, Tomo I (PDF) (in Spanish) (1st ed.). Pachuca de Soto, Hidalgo: Comisión Especial Interinstitucional para conmemorar el Bicentenario de la Independencia Nacional y el Centenario de la Revolución Mexicana de 1910. ISBN 978-607-7866-00-8. Archived from the original on September 14, 2016.
- Manzano Campero, Teodomiro (2009a). Anales del Estado de Hidalgo, Primera parte (608 a 1868), Tercera parte (Apéndice) (PDF) (in Spanish) (2nd ed.). Pachuca de Soto, Hidalgo: Gobierno del Estado de Hidalgo. ISBN 978-607-7866-05-3. Archived from the original on September 14, 2016.
- Manzano Campero, Teodomiro (2009b). Anales del Estado de Hidalgo, Segunda parte (1869 a marzo de 1927) (PDF) (in Spanish) (2nd ed.). Pachuca de Soto, Hidalgo: Gobierno del Estado de Hidalgo. ISBN 978-607-7866-02-2. Archived from the original on September 14, 2016.
- Menes Llaguno, Juan Manuel (2006). Historia mínima del Estado de Hidalgo (in Spanish). M.A. Porrúa. ISBN 970-701-694-9.
- Menes Llaguno, Juan Manuel (2007). Historia de las divisiones territoriales de los municipios del Estado de Hidalgo (in Spanish) (1st ed.). Pachuca, México: Instituto de Estudios Legislativos del Congreso de Hidalgo.
- Rivas Paniagua, Enrique (2008). Lo que el viento nos dejó: hojas del turruño hidalguense (in Spanish) (1st ed.). Pachuca de Soto, Hidalgo: Universidad Autónoma del Estado de Hidalgo. ISBN 978-970-769-128-5.
- Rublúo, Luis (2009). Historia de la Revolución Mexicana en el Estado de Hidalgo (PDF) (in Spanish) (2nd ed.). Pachuca de Soto, Hidalgo: Gobierno del estado de Hidalgo. ISBN 978-607-7866-03-9. Archived from the original on September 14, 2016.
- Ruiz Medrano, Carlos Rubén (2007). "El tumulto de abril de 1757 en Actopan. Coerción laboral y las formas de movilización y resistencia social de las comunidades indígenas". Estudios de Historia Novohispana (in Spanish) (36). Coyoacán, México: Instituto de Investigaciones Históricas (UNAM). ISSN 0185-2523.
- Perujo de la Cruz, Rodrigo (2018). "Conflicto, rebelión y autoridad indígena en los pueblos de indios de Actopan, 1710–1770". Programa de Posgrado en Historia (in Spanish). National Autonomous University of Mexico.
- Vergara Hernández, Arturo (2008). El Infierno en la Pintura Mural Agustina Del Siglo XVI: Actopan y Xoxoteco en el Estado de Hidalgo (PDF) (in Spanish) (1st ed.). Pachuca de Soto: Universidad Autónoma del Estado de Hidalgo. ISBN 978-970-769-057-8. Archived from the original (PDF) on December 8, 2015.
- Vivar Cravioto, Luis Corrales (2012). Conventos Agustinos en Hidalgo Tomo II (PDF) (in Spanish) (1st ed.). Pachuca de Soto, Hidalgo: Mina Editorial para la Dirección General de Publicaciones e Impresos del Gobierno del Estado de Hidalgo. Archived from the original (PDF) on March 4, 2016.
