= Mendicant monasteries in Mexico =

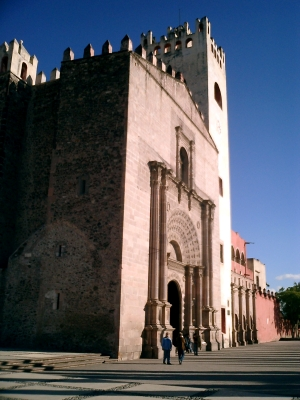
Church and Convent of San Nicolás de Tolentino, Hidalgo

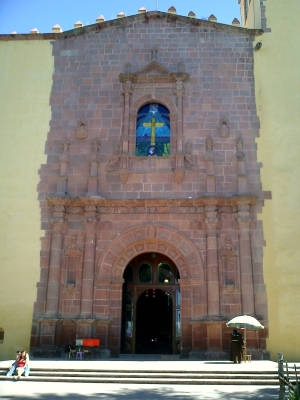
Church and Convent of San Miguel Arcángel, Ixmiquilpan, Hidalgo

Mendicant monasteries in Mexico were among the architectural solutions devised by the friars of the mendicant orders in the 16th century to aid in the evangelization of New Spain. These buildings were designed to serve the religious needs of the vast number of Amerindian indigenous people being evangelized. Over time, due to the policy of reducción (settling indigenous people into centralized communities), these monasteries evolved into social centers for the pueblos de indios. They became hubs for transmitting Western, particularly Castilian, cultural practices, as well as various arts and crafts, healthcare, and even funeral services.

The buildings were based on architectural styles that were already out of use at the time, such as Romanesque and Gothic, and were modeled on the European monastic tradition—particularly the Cluny Abbey. However, they incorporated innovative elements, such as the atrial cross and the capilla abierta (open chapel), and were characterized by various decorative styles as well as a fortress-like appearance. Among these structures, found throughout the central regions of modern Mexico, emerged a distinctive art form known as tequitqui or Indochristian art. This style was created by indigenous artisans who worked on the buildings, blending European patterns under the guidance of the friars with their own artistic sensibilities.

== Ideological inspirations ==
The mendicant friars expressed their vision through the architecture, sculpture, and paintings of their buildings, drawing inspiration from millennialism, Joachinism, and the Counter-Reformation. These influences, though distant in time and space, reflected their aspiration to reestablish and renew the Church in the New World. Entrusted with the task of evangelizing the recently conquered Mesoamerican indigenous peoples, the friars designed monasteries as comprehensive ensembles of didactic and symbolic elements. These structures featured iconographic programs and diverse components that encapsulated the beliefs and experiences the mendicants had accumulated from similar missions in Europe, Asia, and Africa.

The monastic buildings incorporated a deliberately medieval and archaic appearance, with an intentional nod to ancient styles. The builders drew inspiration from architectural influences that had been used centuries earlier in Europe but adapted them with the construction techniques of the 16th century.

=== Romanesque elements ===
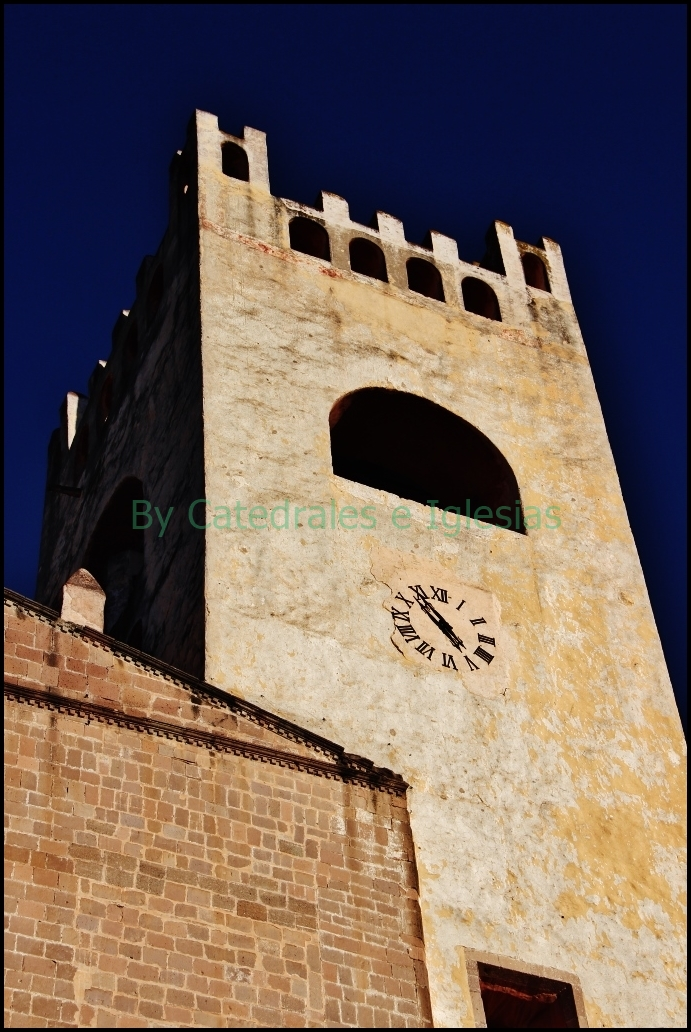
Tower with Romanesque influence in the Church and Convent of San Nicolás de Tolentino, Actopan, Hidalgo

- The dimension of the naves
- The thickness of the walls
- The use of buttresses, flying buttresses, rounded arches
- Use of bell-gables serving as bell towers
- Sculptures on facades
- Barrel vaults made of stone

=== Gothic elements ===
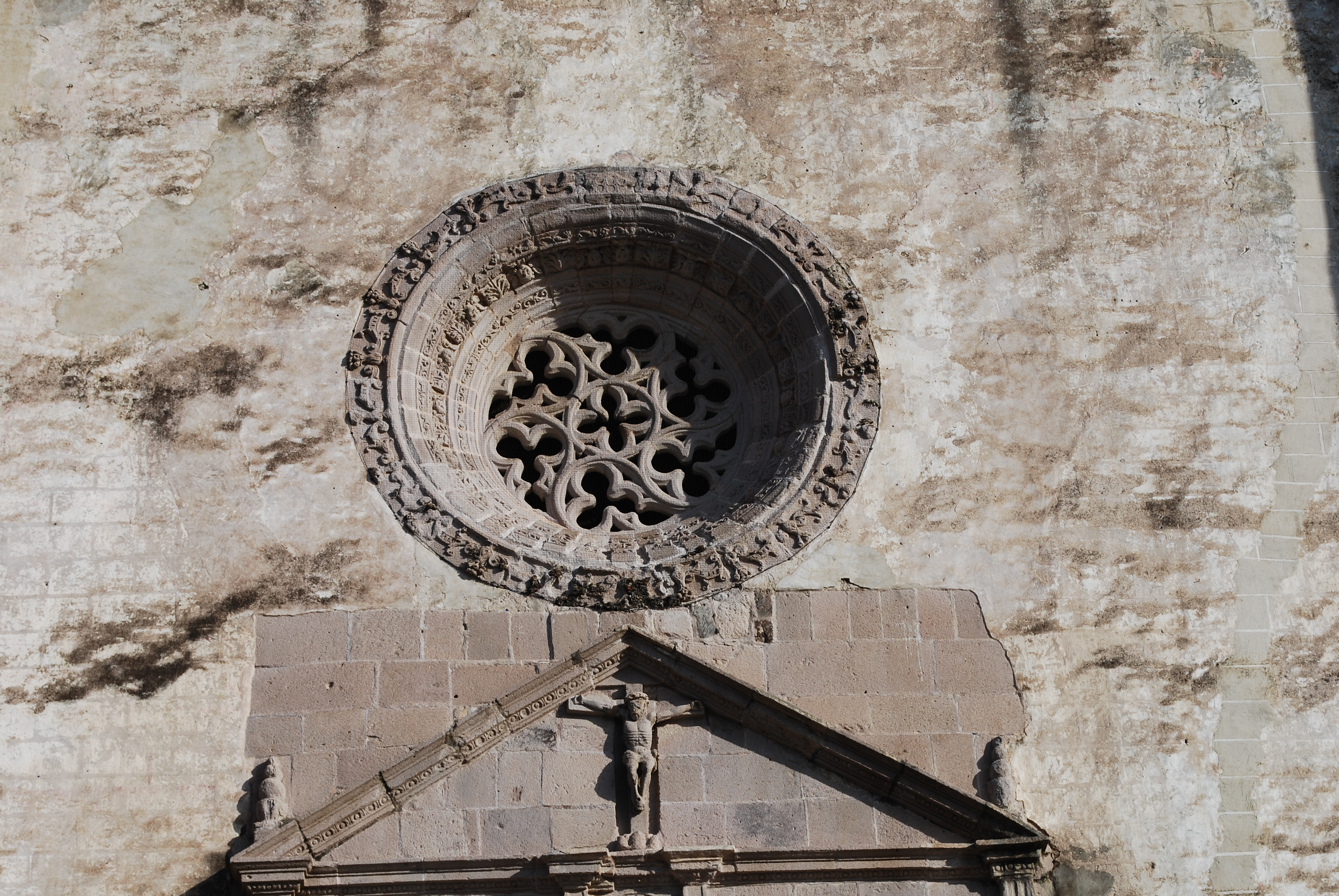
Rose window in Yecapixtla, Morelos

- Ascentional direction
- Decorative rib vaults rather than functional or supporting
- Rose windows of stone. Example is preserved in Yecapixtla, Morelos.
- Pointed arches
- Segmental arches type basket arch in the cloisters, mainly.

=== Mudéjar elements ===
- Decoration with yeserias
- Use of alfarjes
- Spaces with arcades. An example is the chapel of San Gabriel Franciscan Convent, Cholula

The mendicant buildings of the 16th century share a similar layout in their basic elements with European monasteries, as well as comparable decorative and structural characteristics. These structures were constructed under the direct supervision of friars using manuals from the Old World. The builders maintained symmetrical designs and proportions that echoed, in an intentionally archaic manner, the layout of the 4th-century Benedictine monastery. These buildings featured the same war-inspired stereotomy, with thick walls, prominent buttresses, significant height emphasizing an ascensional direction, and merlons. These elements mirrored European monasteries, which often served as military strongholds against Moors or Saracens.

== Architectural structure ==
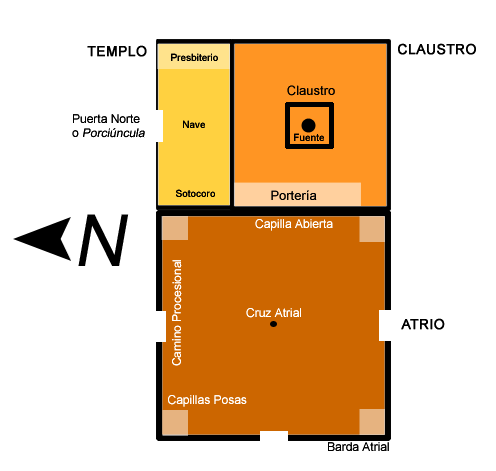
Diagram of the parts of a complex-monastery of the 16th century in New Spain. The orientation of the buildings was always with the altar pointing east (Templo is church, claustro is cloister and atrio is atrium).

The construction and arrangement of the buildings were designed with the intention of returning to the ideals of the primitive Church, incorporating solutions and spaces specifically created to uphold the Regula of St. Benedict of Nursia.

=== Atrium ===
The atrium was a unique architectural solution in New Spain, developed by the friars to serve as a large open square for the celebration of Mass. Over time, as described by priest Diego de Valadés in his Rhetorica Christiana, the atrium evolved into the primary social space for the indigenous population. It became a central hub for the transmission of Western civilization, where European arts and crafts, the Spanish language, and religious and civil precepts were taught.

The primary function of the atrium was to host various religious celebrations in addition to Mass, including processions and theatrical performances, such as edifying theater, which the indigenous people enjoyed as a didactic form of teaching. The indigenous population readily accepted outdoor ceremonies for Mass, as conducting rituals in open spaces was a common practice in Mesoamerican culture.

=== Atrial cross ===
At the center of the atrium, serving as a symbolic and geographical marker of the town's foundation, a stone cross was erected on a base. This cross featured elements representing the attributes of the Passion of Jesus.

=== Wall in the atrium ===
The atrial space was enclosed by an atrial wall, which also served as a reminder of the coatepantlis found in the ceremonial centers of Mesoamerican peoples. The wall was typically adorned with almenados (battlements) and finely crafted decorative finishes. The only exception was the atrium of Molango, Puebla, where a spadaña (bell wall) was placed in the atrial fence, separate from the temple.

=== Processional path ===
One of the most common practices was the mass processions. The route for these processions was defined along the perimeter of the atrial wall, marked by shrubs, small walls, or trees.

=== Capilla posa ===
At the four corners of the atrium were built four chapels—an original feature of New Spain—vaulted and decorated, which served as places to place or rest the Blessed Sacrament during processions after Mass. These chapels were assigned to the care of each of the town's neighborhoods and were also known as capillas de comunidad or capillas de indios. Examples include the chapels in Huejotzingo and Calpan, Puebla.

=== Church ===
In many towns of present-day Mexico, 16th-century churches exist with identifiable architectural characteristics, often rising above the surrounding population due to their height. Many of these churches were built on Mesoamerican teocallis (sacred pyramids), as seen in Texcoco, Tlaxcala, Huejotzingo, Cholula, Tula, and Huexotla. This was done to "disintegrate the old way of life and sustain a new cult over the old one." It is noteworthy that many monasteries were erected in towns that now have few inhabitants but were once important population centers. This effect was achieved through the ascensional direction of the walls, their thickness, and the use of flying buttresses, buttresses, and a floor plan based on a nave.

=== Nave ===
Although many monasteries were modified during colonial times with the addition of bell towers, side naves, or a Latin cross floor plan in later centuries, the majority were originally built with a single nave and a rectangular shape, slightly trapezoidal at the apse. They featured a roof made of palm or artesonado (a decorative wooden ceiling), which was later replaced by arched stone barrel vaults, ornamented with ribs attached in a Gothic style—these ribs had no structural function and were intentionally archaic.

== Monasteries by state ==
=== State of Mexico ===
- Church and Convent of San Agustín, Acolman

=== Hidalgo ===
See: Mendicant monasteries of Hidalgo

=== Michoacán ===
See: Conventual Missions of Michoacán

=== Morelos ===
- Yecapixtla
- Cathedral of Cuernavaca
- Ocuituco
- Tepoztlán
- Tetela del Volcán (franciscan)
- Oaxtepec (franciscan)
- Atlatlahucan
- Jiutepec
- Ocotepec
- Yautepec
- Hueyapan
- Tlatizapan
- Tlaquitenango
- Tlayacapan
- Totolapan
- Tlanepantla
- Pazulco
- Jonacatepec
- Zacualpan
- Jantetelco
- Jumiltepec

=== Oaxaca ===
Dominicans:

- San Miguel Achiutla
- Coixtlahuaca
- Cuilapan de Guerrero
- Coatlán
- Etla
- Ixtepexi
- Nejapa
- Ocotlán de Morelos
- Tonalá
- Santo Tomás Tamazulapan
- San Juan Teposcolula
- Tecomaxtlahuaca
- Tlaxiaco
- Totontepec Villa de Morelos
- Santo Domingo Yanhuitlán

=== Puebla ===
- Huejotzingo
- Calpan
- Cholula
- Molango
- Huauchinango

=== Querétaro ===
See: Franciscan Missions in the Sierra Gorda

== Contemporary studies ==
The historiography on the subject—art historian Manuel Toussaint being the first to use the term—refers to these buildings as "convents-fortresses" due to their defensive features and military-inspired elements. The leading scholar on these buildings, George Kubler, noted in his Mexican Architecture of the Sixteenth Century that the military function of these structures was largely ineffective in the event of a possible indigenous attack, as demonstrated by the attack in Xilitla, San Luis Potosí, in 1548. Historian Arturo Schroeder Cordero emphasized their significance in contrast to other architectural solutions, such as skyscrapers.

== See also ==
- Indochristian art
