= Atrial cross =

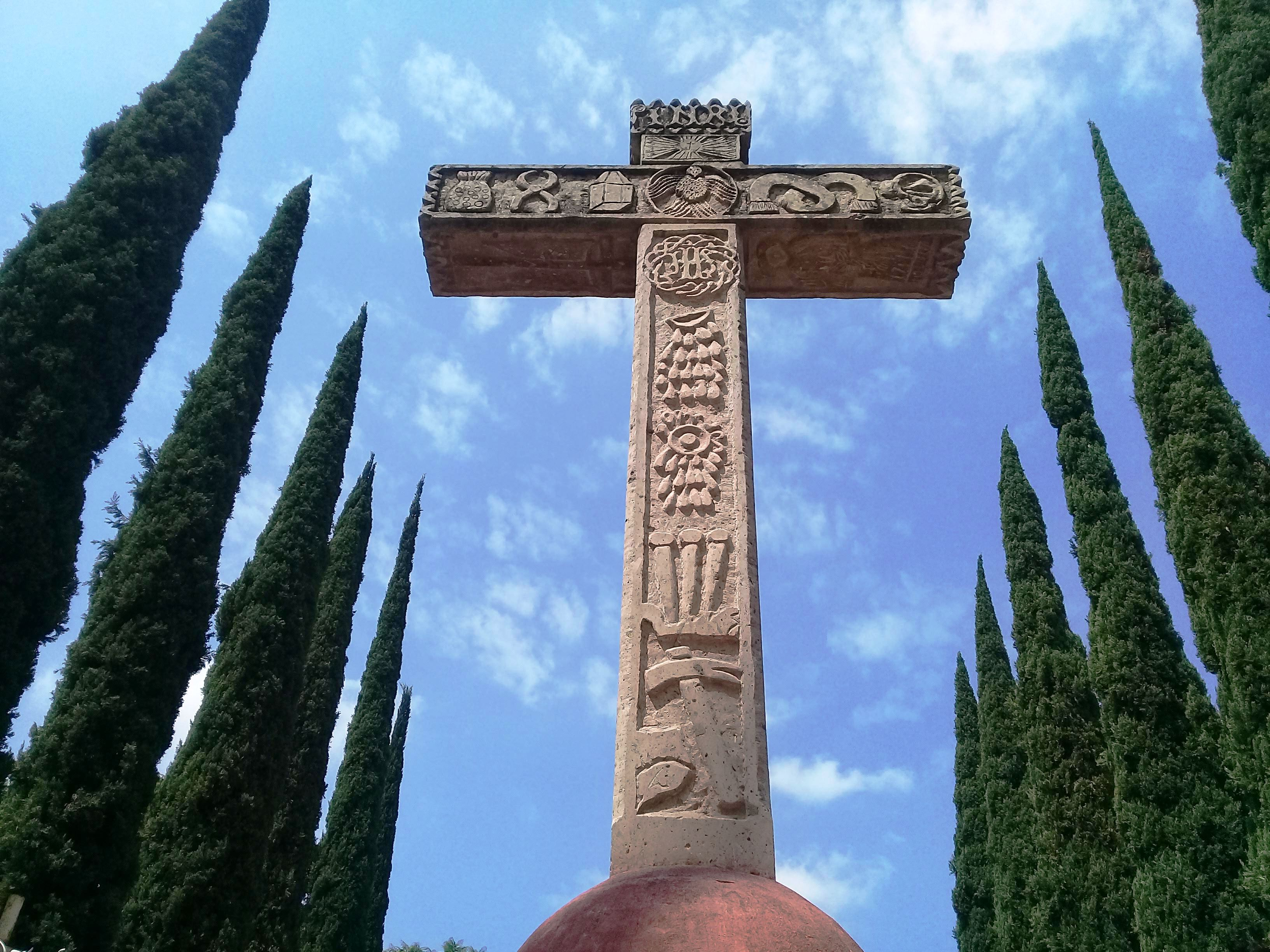
Atrial cross at the Church and Convent of San Nicolás de Tolentino

An atrial cross is a large cross placed in the capilla abierta, atrium, or large open space in front of Mexican church buildings. Most from recent centuries are in stone, with extensive ornamental carving in relief. They are a distinctive element of religious architecture in Mexico.

Originating during the Novohispanic era, these crosses reflect the fusion of pre-Columbian cultures and European Christianity. These stone sculptures, particularly found in the Valley of Mexico, are an element of an architectural style known as Tequitqui.

They may be compared with high cross tradition of the British Isles, also begun in a newly-converted society.

== History and symbolism ==
Atrial crosses have their roots in the time of the Spanish conquest of Mexico. Originally made from wood, they were commonly erected in the atriums of new churches and convents, serving as focal points for the evangelization of Indigenous populations. These crosses became symbols of the Catholic Church's presence and a visual reminder of the new faith being introduced. Mendicant friars placed the crosses in the center of their buildings to symbolize their belief in the centrality of Jesus Christ; for Mesoamericans the central placement also evoked the axis mundi.

They were normally produced by indigenous artisans. As a result, they combined symbolic Christian iconography like the Arma Christi with Indigenous iconography, such as local plants.

The pictographic nature of these sculptures was used to help convey the passion of Jesus to Indigenous peoples.

The face of Jesus Christ is sometimes included on the crosses. Some of these depictions have Indigenous facial features rather than European. The inclusion of plants and flowers has been interpreted as a symbolic representation of the atrial cross as a tree of life.

== Gallery ==
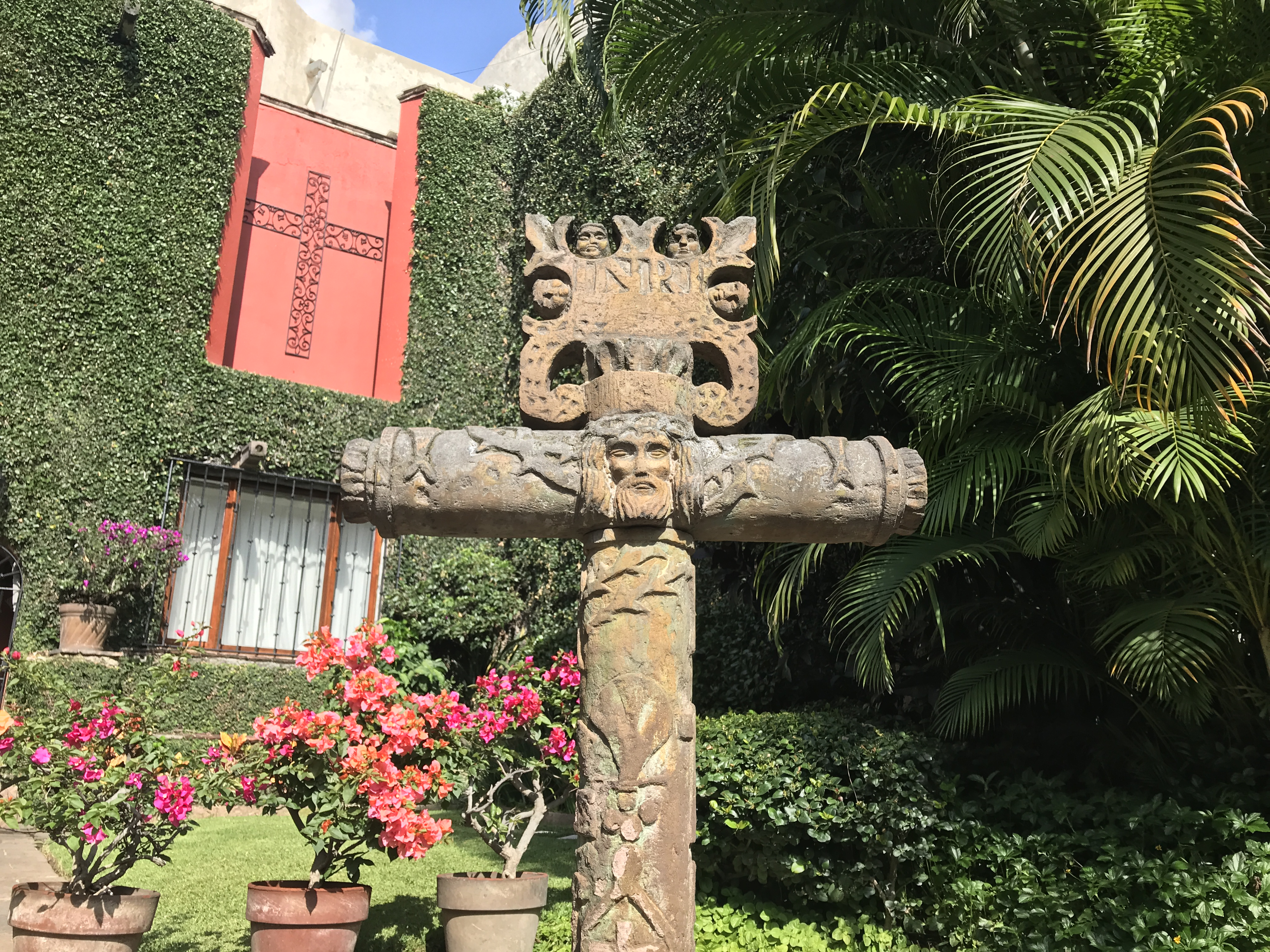
Example now in a museum garden

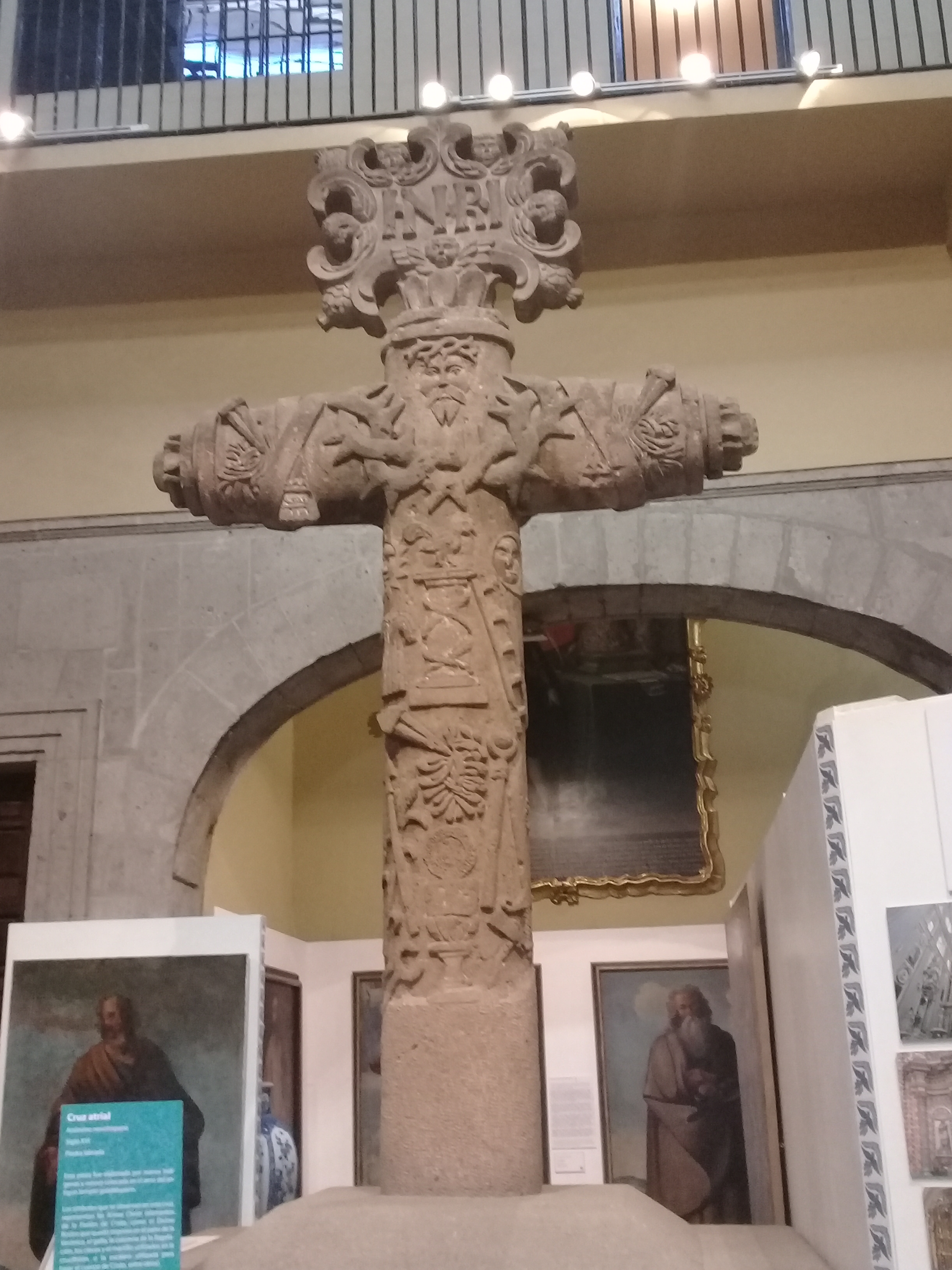
Museum of Basílica de Guadalupe

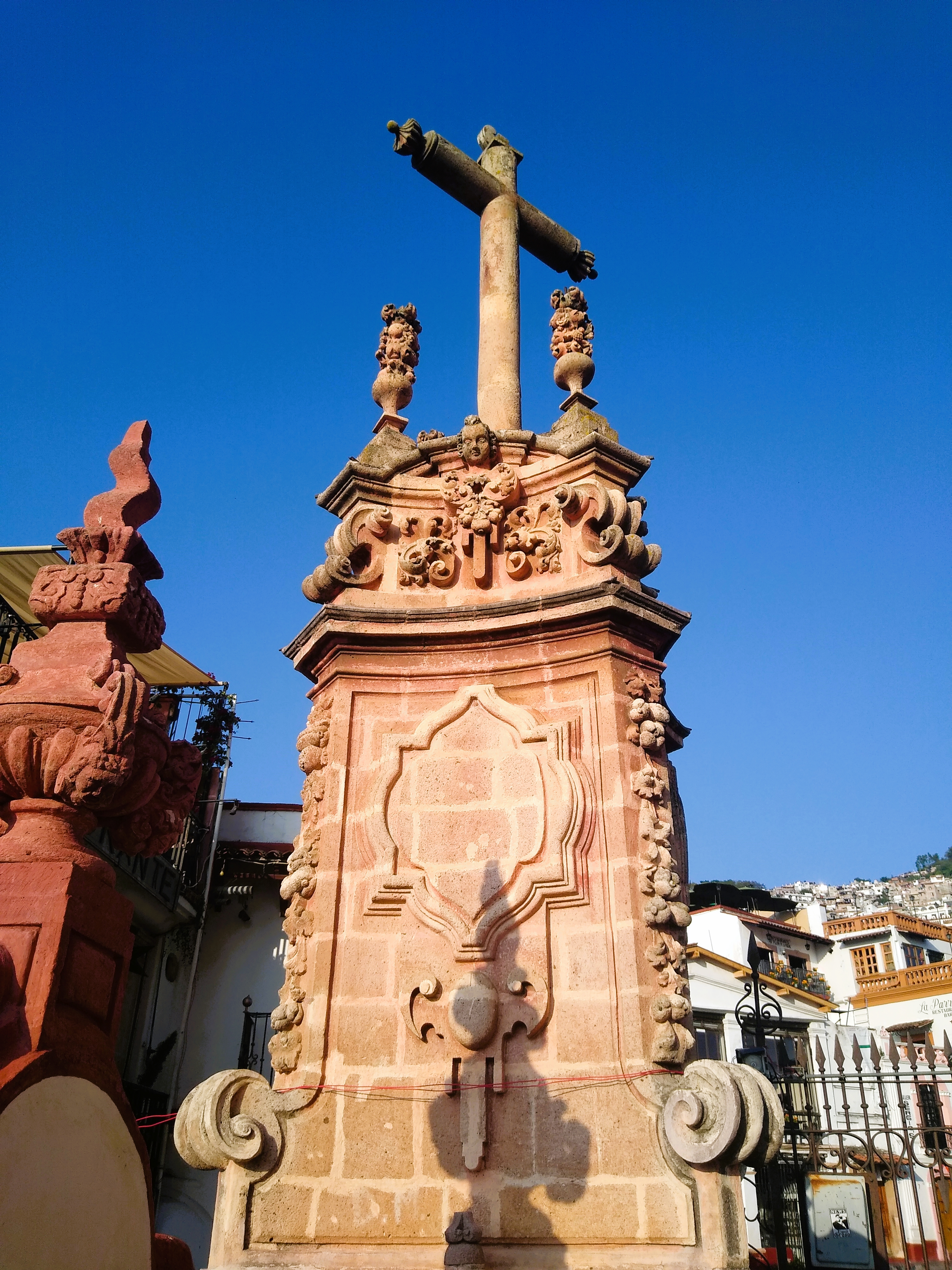
Church of Santa Prisca, Taxco, Guerrero

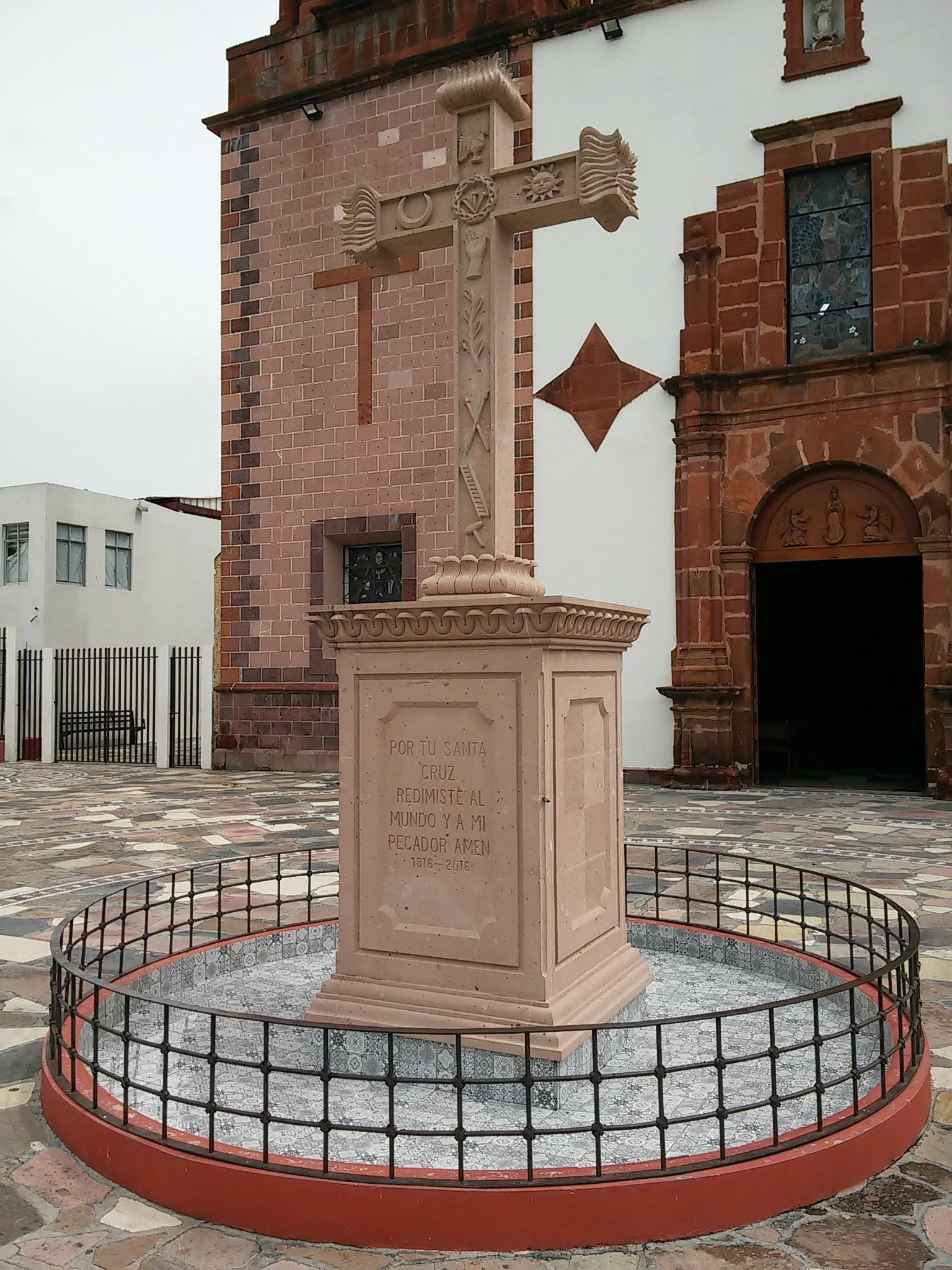
A modern (from 2017) atrial cross in Yurécuaro, Michoacán

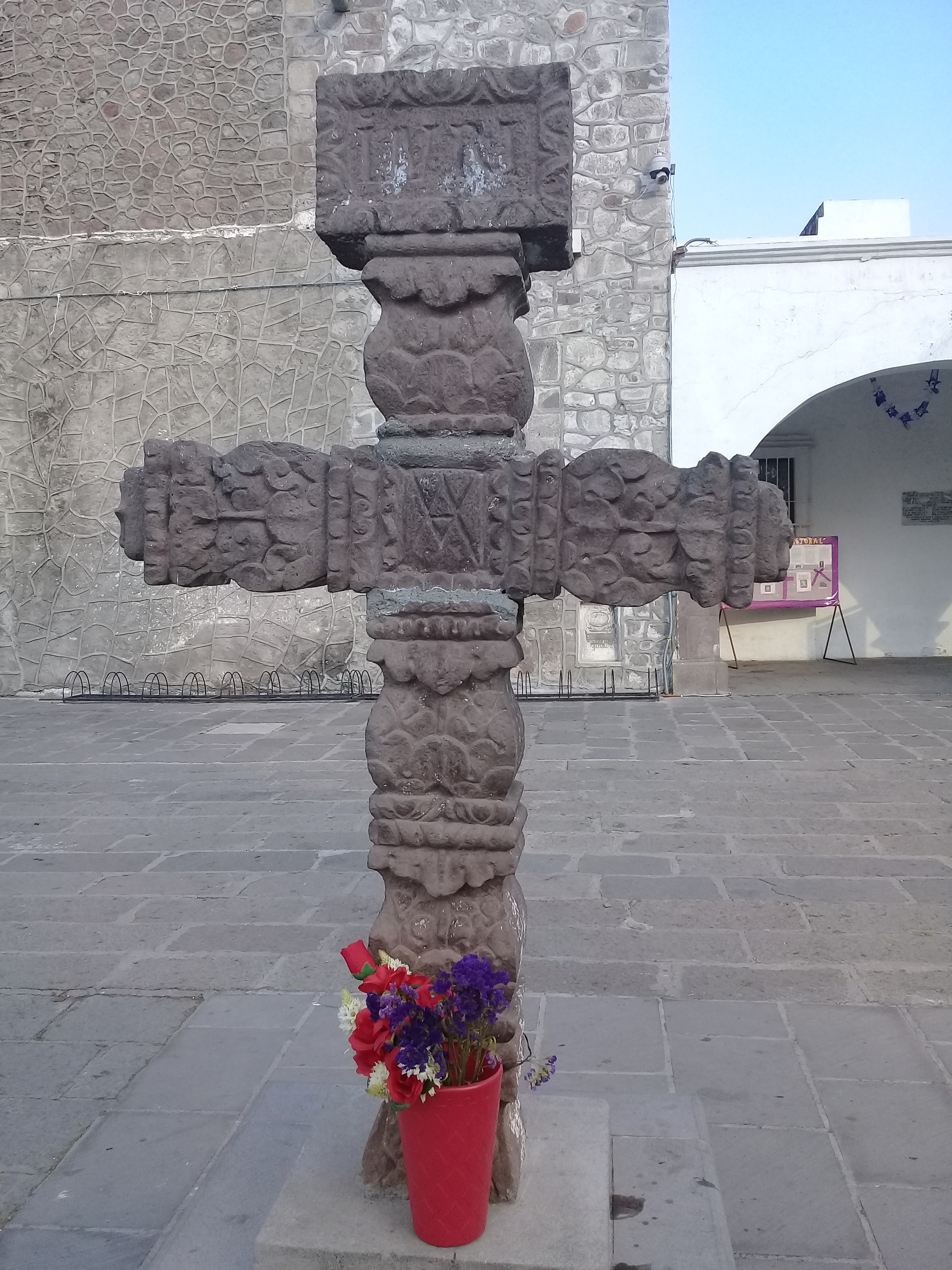
Zacatelco, Tlaxcala

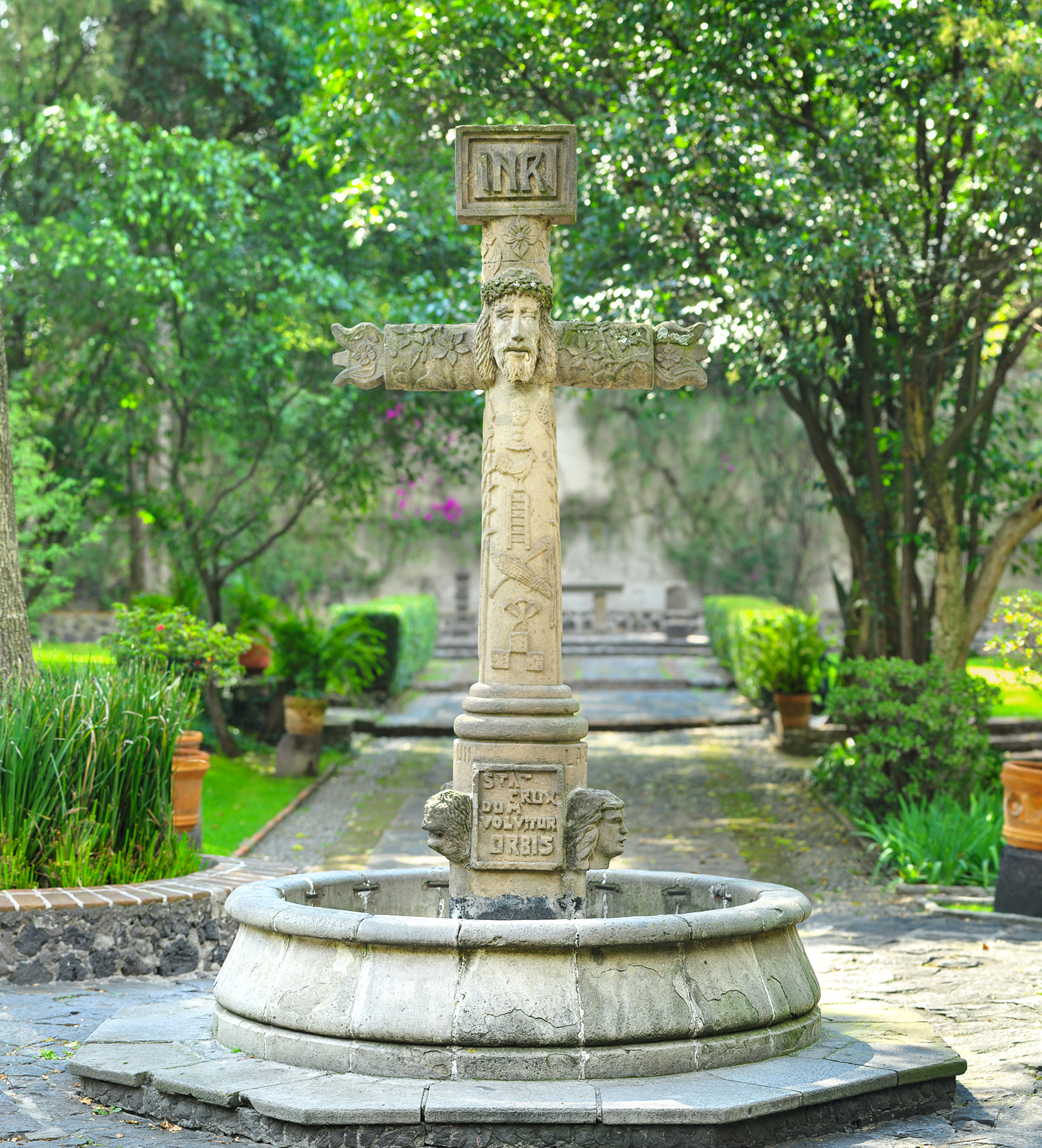
Church of San Jacinto, San Ángel, Mexico City
