= Church and Convent of San Nicolás de Tolentino =

San Nicolás Tolentino Temple and Ex-Monastery
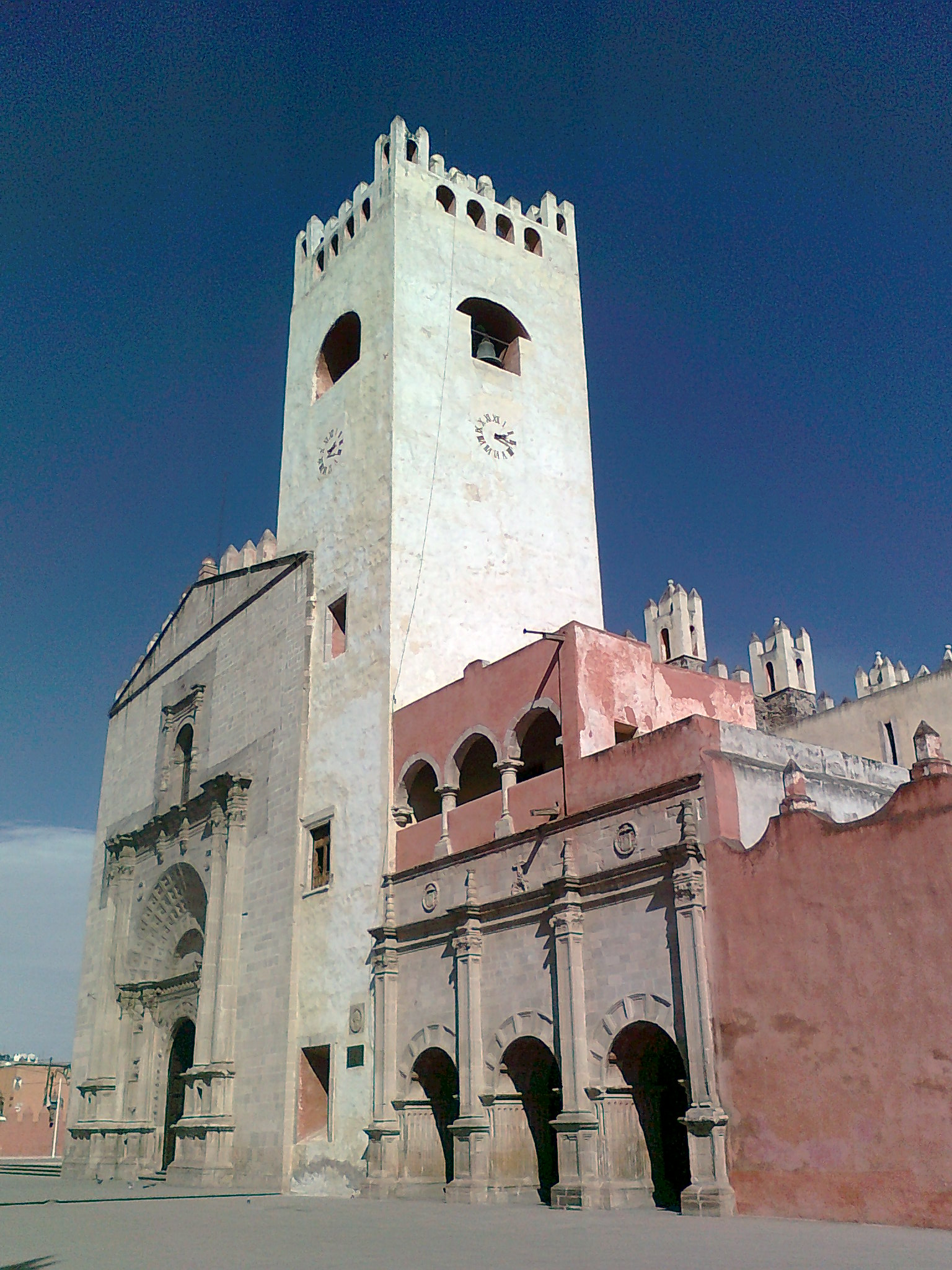
- San Nicolás Tolentino Temple and Ex-Monastery
- 20°16′6″N 98°56′35″W
- Location: Actopan
- Country: Mexico
- Denomination: Roman Catholic

History
- Status: Monastery
- Consecrated: 1550

The Church and Convent of San Nicolás de Tolentino is the Catholic church and parish house of the people of Actopan. It has always belonged to the Diocese of Tulancingo in Mexico. This church is located in the center of city. This colonial building is a monument of great architectural importance which has lasted until today in the State of Hidalgo.

The convent was founded in 1546, although it was officially ordained in 1548, the work is attributed to friar Andrés de Mata. The construction began in 1550 and by 1573 the set was already completed and had a church, capilla abierta, convent, stables, orchard and a huge cistern for the uses of the community. Its architectural style brings together most of the styles present in the Viceroyalty of New Spain. Shows a combination of Plateresque, Mudéjar, Gothic, Romanesque and Renaissance styles; and after elements of the Neoclassical were added.

== Gallery ==
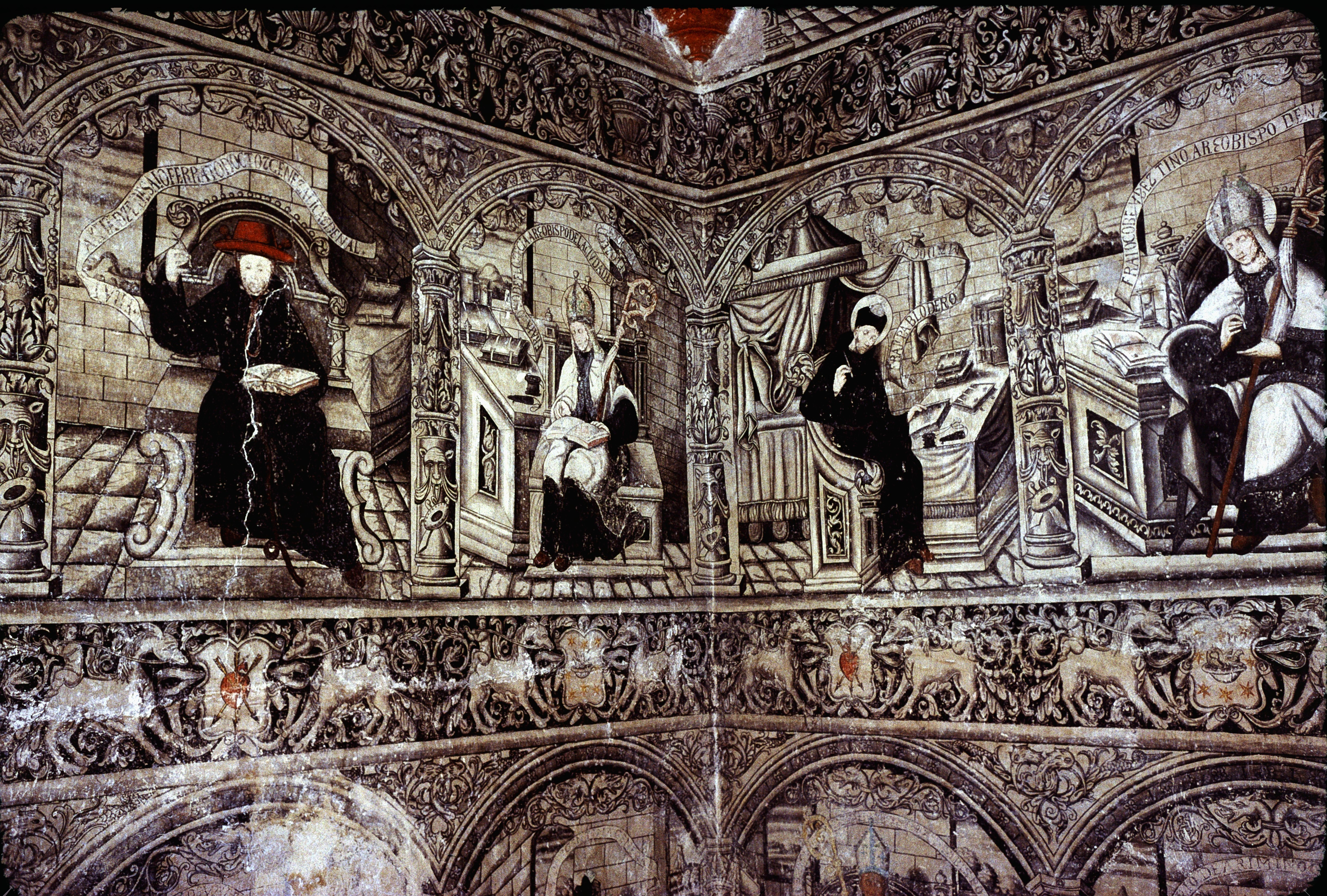
The paintings

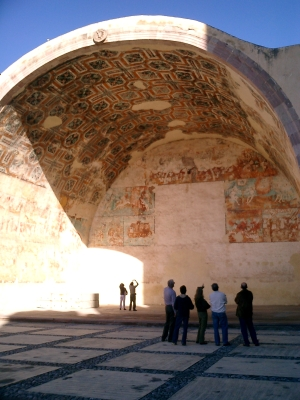
The Capilla abierta

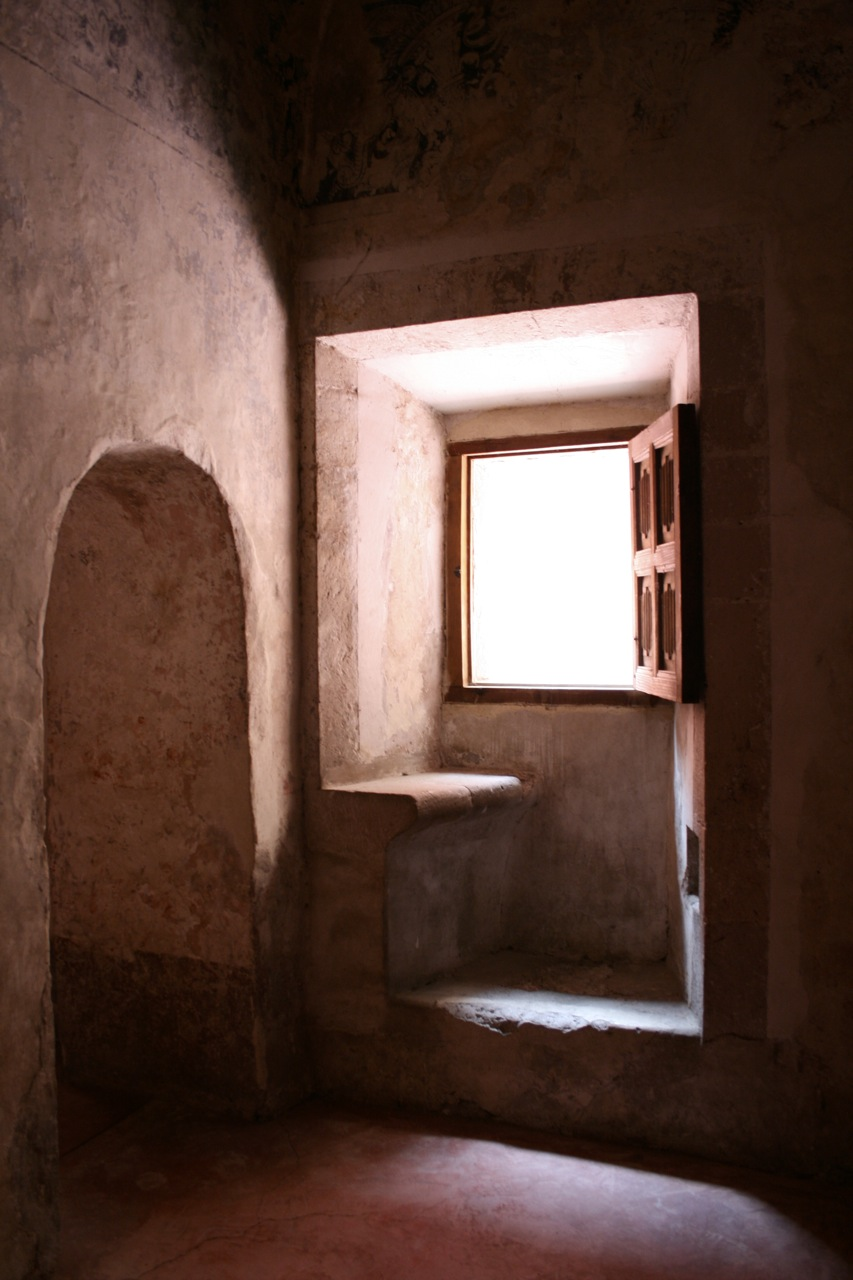

== See also ==
- Mendicant monasteries in Mexico
