= San Gabriel Franciscan Convent, Cholula =

San Gabriel Franciscan Convent
- San Gabriel Friary
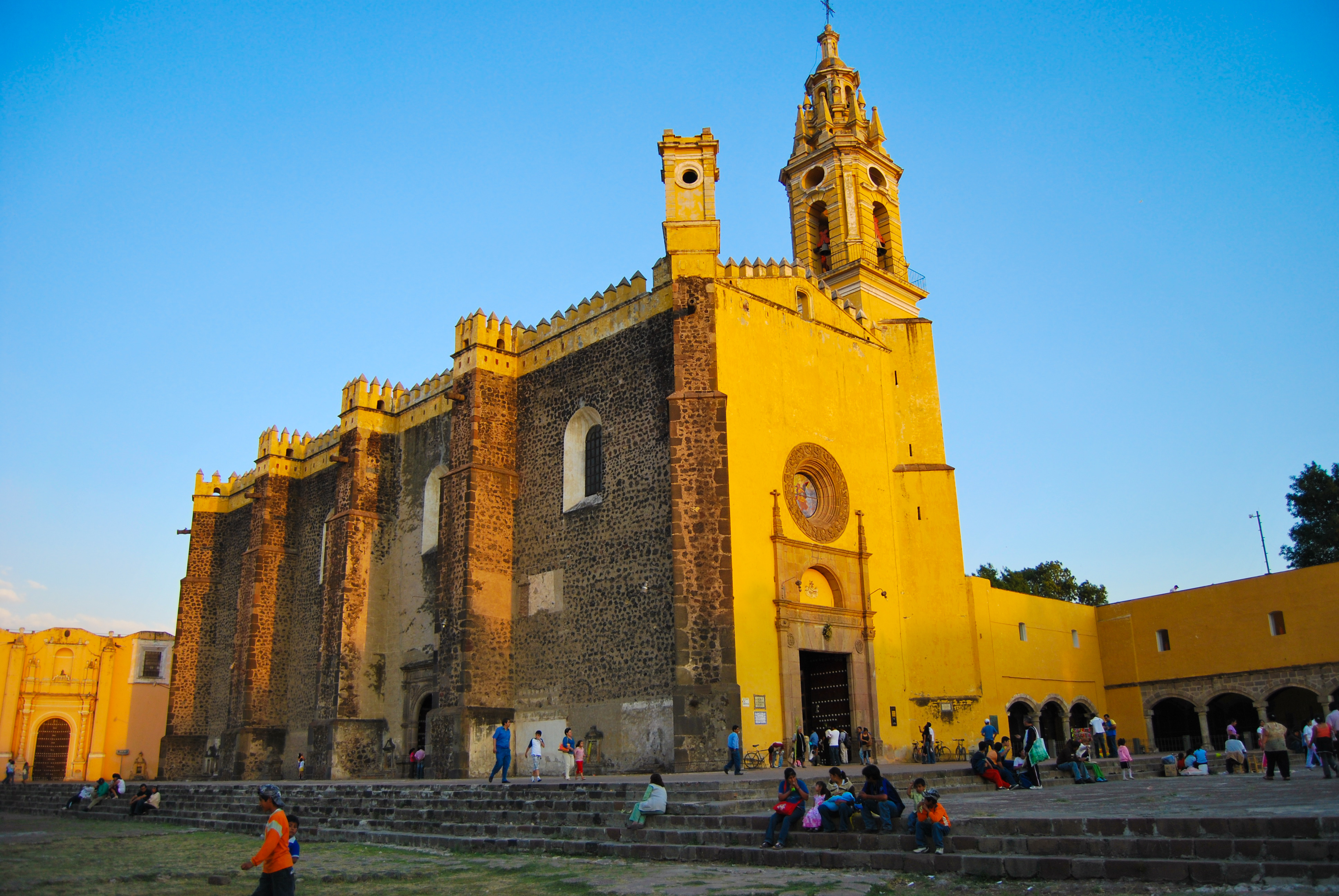
- Entrance to the church of the convent
- San Gabriel Franciscan Convent
- 19°3′44″N 98°18′16″W
- Location: Cholula, Puebla
- Country: Mexico

The San Gabriel Franciscan Convent or San Gabriel Friary is a church and friary in Cholula, Metropolitan area of Puebla City, Mexico.

== Description and history ==
The San Gabriel church and friary was established in 1529 by the Order of Friar Minors, OFM, Franciscans, after destroying the temple to Quetzalcoatl with evangelization as its initial purpose. The current complex was built in the 1540s, beginning with the Capilla Real in 1540. The main church was begun in 1549, with the first stone laid by Martín de Hojacastro, who would become the third bishop of Puebla. There is also a third chapel by the name of the Capilla de la Tercera Orden and a cloister. The friary is dedicated to the Archangel Gabriel and is one of the largest Franciscan friaries in Mexico.

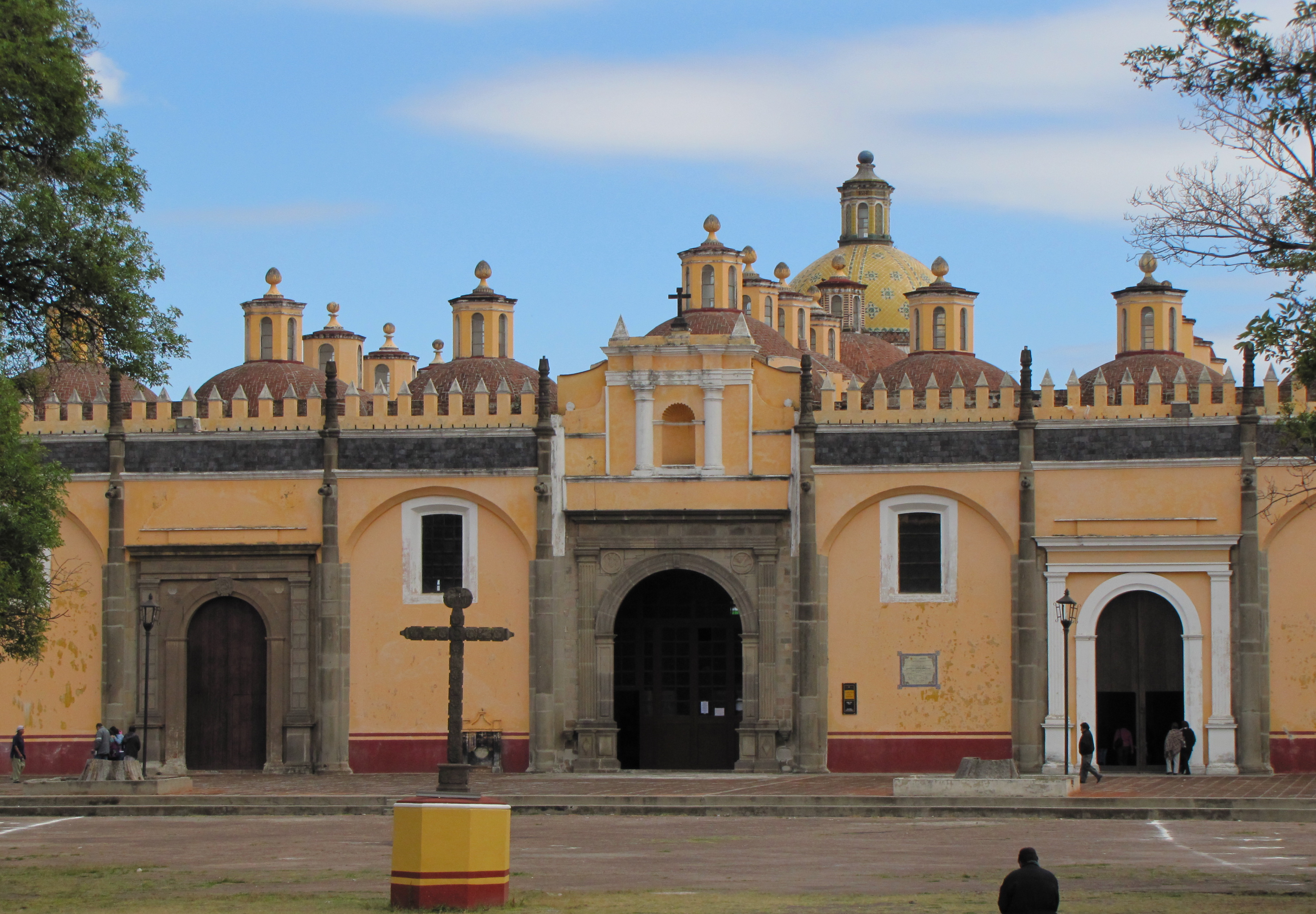
Front façade of the Capilla Real

The exterior is partially Gothic. The complex is surrounded by a wall with pointed merlons which separates it from the main plaza of the city. The atrium is very large, with most of the space located in front of the two chapels. There are two portals on the west atrium wall, one that leads into the main atrium space and chapels, used for the indigenous population in the very early colonial period and the other directly in front of the main church. In three corners of the atrium, there are chapels, called "capillas posas", with pinnacle roofs and simple arches which are closed off by railings. These were used for outdoor processions. The atrium cross was sculpted in 1668 and is identical to that in the atrium of the Nuestra Señora de los Remedios sanctuary. The façade of the main church is smooth and its corners are reinforced with diagonal buttresses. This façade has been altered over time with the additions of a bell gable and a Baroque tower. The tower contains arched windows, columns and a small dome topped by an iron cross. The main portal is sculpted in sandstone in Renaissance style. The main doors are of wood and contain metal studs with different designs. The north portal has richer ornamentation. The bell tower suffered some damage in the September, 2017 earthquake.

The church has one long nave, which is divided into various sections and covered by Gothic style vaults and cupola. The interior has a Latin cross layout, with Gothic ribs on the vaults and arched window openings. It conserves a number of oil paintings from the 17th and 18th centuries. The altarpieces are Neoclassical, made of wood and plaster, painted white and decorated in gold leaf. The main altar dates from 1897 and is dedicated to the Virgin of the Remedies.

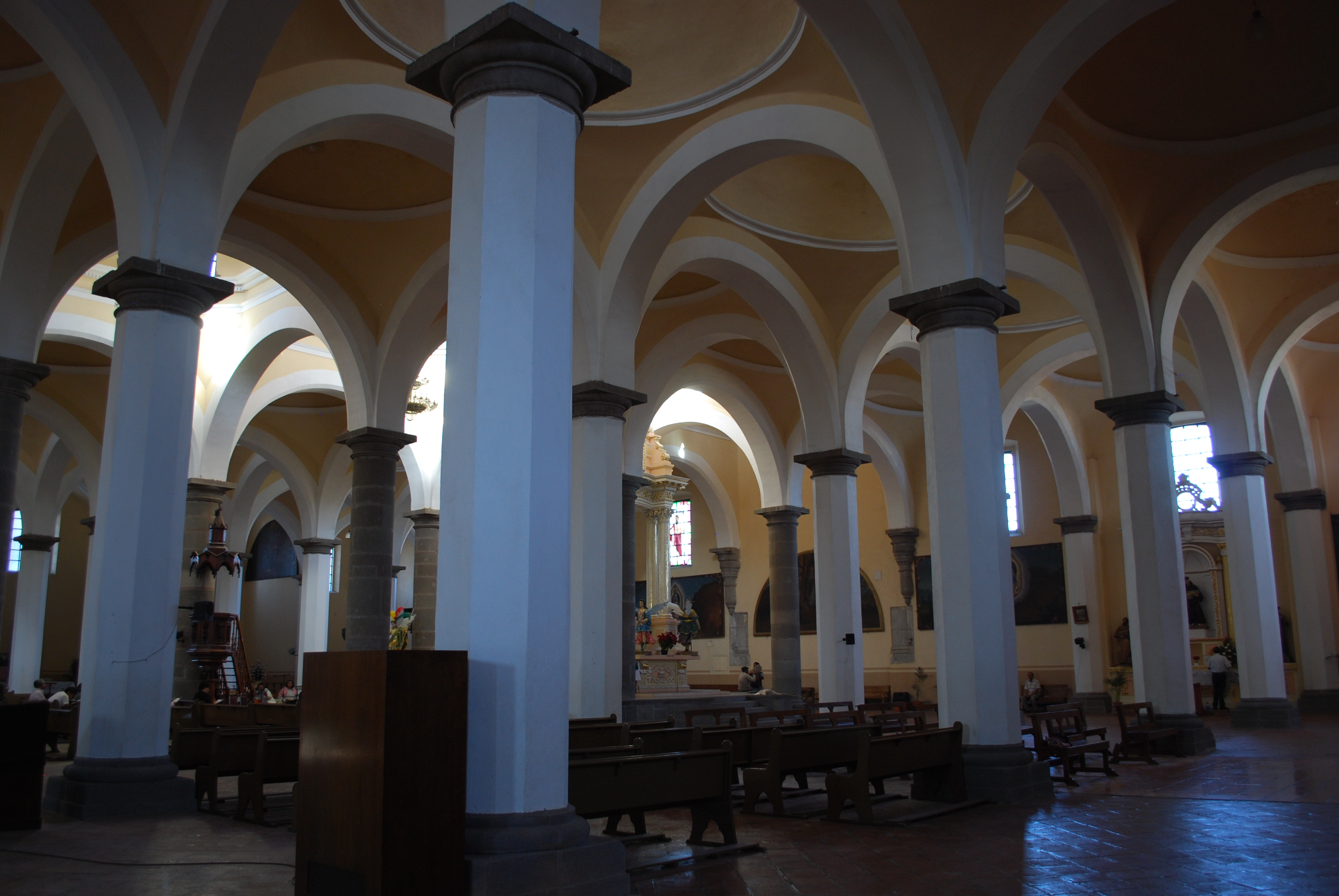
Inside the Capilla Real

The Capilla Real (Royal Chapel) is also called the Capilla de Naturales (Indigenous Chapel). It is located on the north end of the friary complex, behind the large atrium area. The chapel never received any kind of royal recognition, but the name, "Capilla Real" is thought to have come from area dedicated to the Virgin of the Remedies, the patron of Cholula. The first chapel here was built in 1540, but the current structure dates from the 17th century, with the interior redone in 1947. The façade has some Baroque elements, with its main entrance marked by a simple arch flanked by Corinthian columns and fluted pilasters The choral window is flanked by Ionic columns. The crest is a pediment with a flutter. What makes this chapel unique is that its construction is similar to a mosque, with forty nine cupolas, supported by twelve columns and twenty four octagonal pilasters. The interior is divided into seven naves, and there are chapels on the two sides with their entrances supported by twelve of the structure's pilasters. This interior is not decorated, with murals or gold leaf like the main church or the Tercera Orden chapel; rather the walls are plain and the main altar is between the center of the structure and the back wall, leaving an area free. This back area contains three large paintings depicting the story of the Virgin of Guadalupe. The holy water font dates from the 16th century. The base and cup are sculpted from one piece of stone. The base is decorated with acanthus leaves, other flowers and leaves and a simple molding which imitates the cord Franciscans use to tie over their habits.

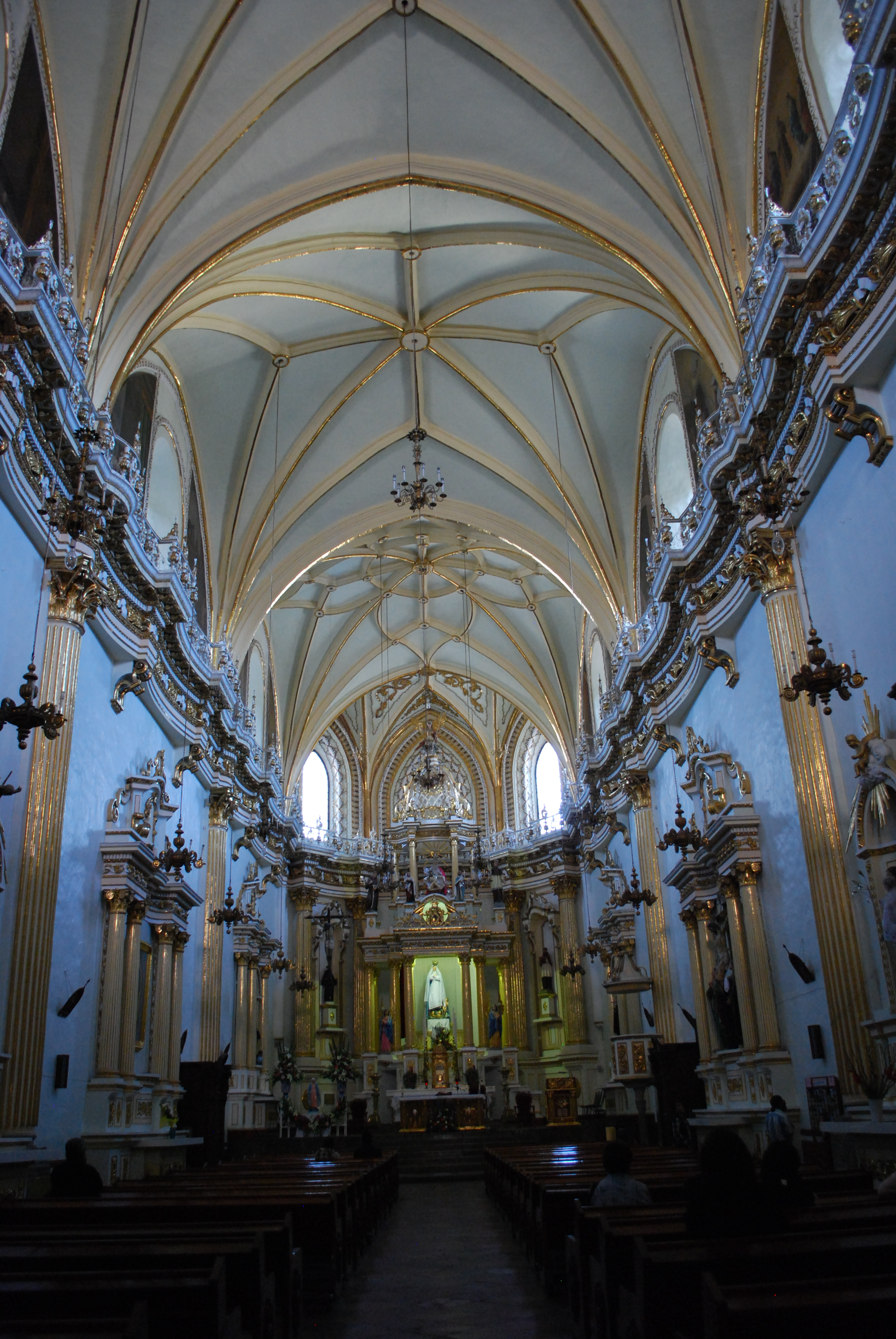
Nave of the main church of San Gabriel

The Capilla de la Tercera Orden (Chapel of the Third Order) is a much smaller chapel and located between the Capilla Real and the main church, also fronted by the large atrium area. The façade has a Baroque portal with Solomonic columns. Inside, there is gold ornamentation and seven large 18th and 19th century paintings. In the pendentives of the cupolas there are more paintings of various important Franciscans. The altars are Neoclassical in white and gold, and two large windows were opened on either side of the main altar to let in more light.

The cloister area of the complex still functions as a friary and inhabited by about ten Franciscan friars who run a large K-12 school on the complex as well as many other pastoral as well as justice, peace and respect for creation activities. For this reason, it is not open to the public. This friary also houses the Vocation Office to help young men from the States of Guerrero, Mexico, Mexico City, Oaxaca, Puebla, Tlaxcala, and Veracruz be part of a discernment process to see if they are being called to be Franciscan friars. The original cloister contains a number of murals similar to those at the former friary of Huejotzingo. The upper floor has one called the Mass of Saint Gregory and the ground floor contains frescos with scenes from the life of Francis of Assisi, along with portraits of a number of Franciscan friars. In 1986, an annex to the cloister area was converted into Franciscan Library in cooperation with the Universidad de las Americas, just five minutes away. The friars were originally opposed to the project, as the friary likely sits on the remains of the Quetzalcoatl Temple, and they were concerned about being forced out. In the end, the Franciscans co-sponsored the library with the university. This library contains more than 25,000 volumes published between the 16th and the 19th centuries. One of the foremost Franciscan history scholars of Latin America, Fray Francisco Morales, OFM resides in the friary and directs the Franciscan Library.

== See also ==
- Mendicant monasteries in Mexico
- 18th-century Western domes
