= Dzibilchaltun =

Maya archaeological site with cenote in Yucatan, Mexico

Dzibilchaltún
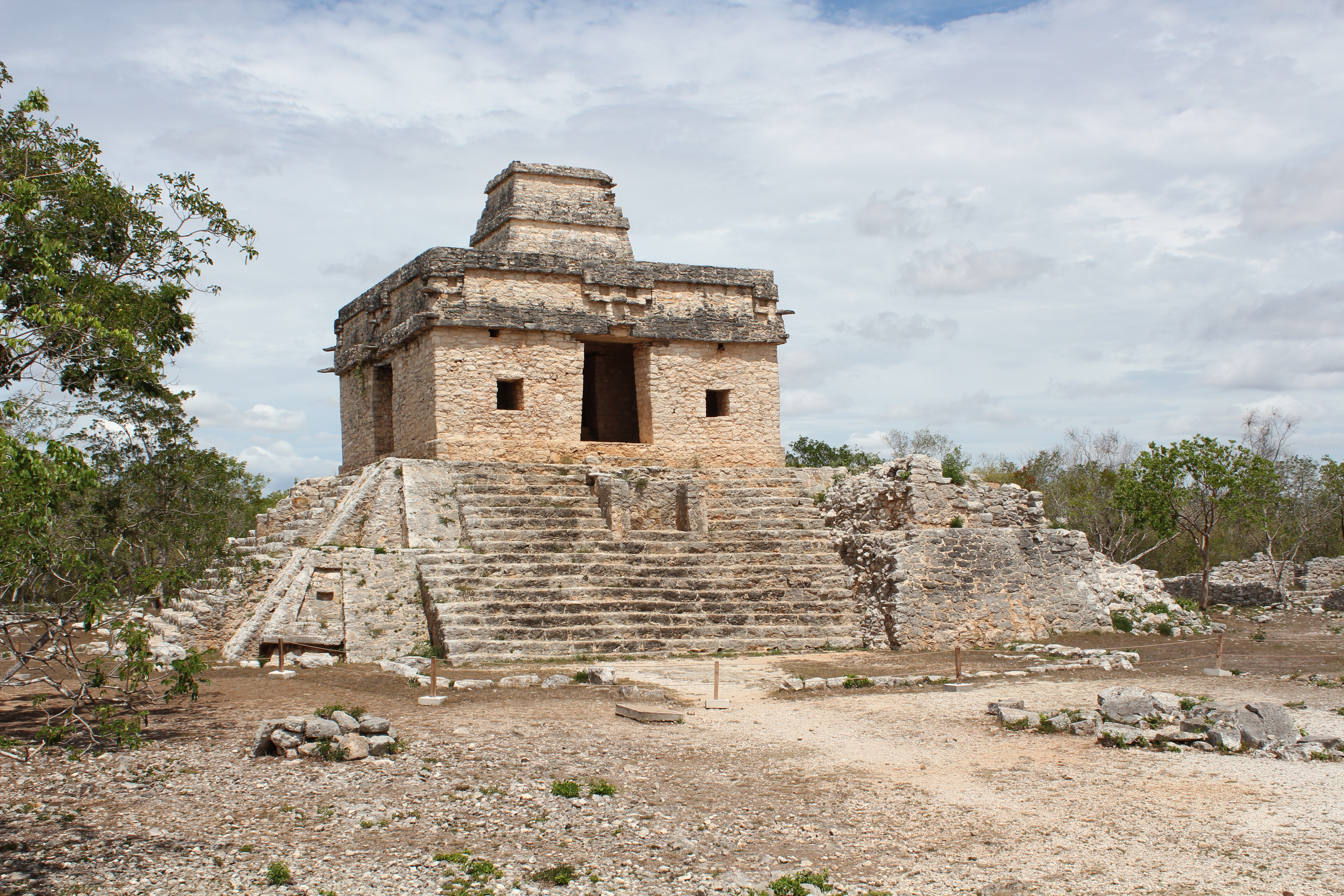
- Temple of the Seven Dolls at Dzibilchaltun

- Location within Mesoamerica
- Interactive map of Dzibilchaltún
- 21°5′27.60″N 89°35′25.08″W
- Cultures: Maya civilization
- Location: Yucatán, Mexico
- Region: Yucatán

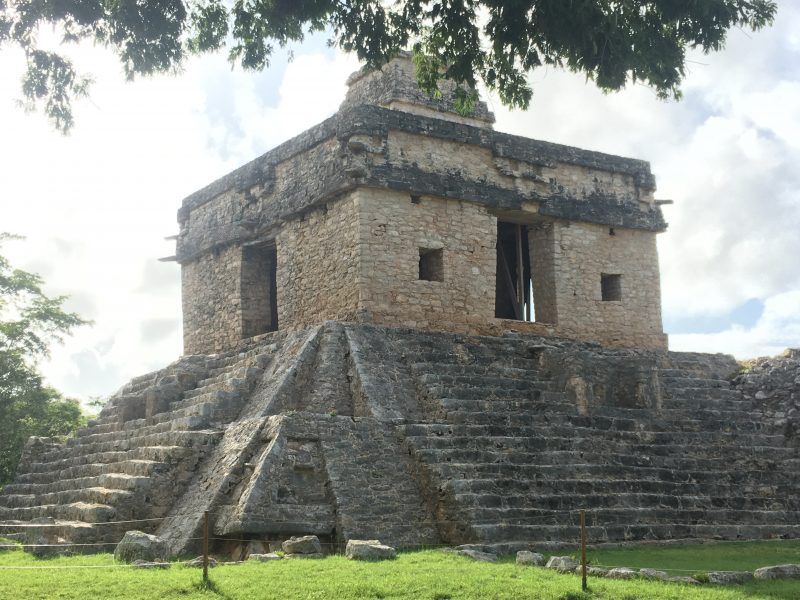
Archway of the Temple of the 7 Doll

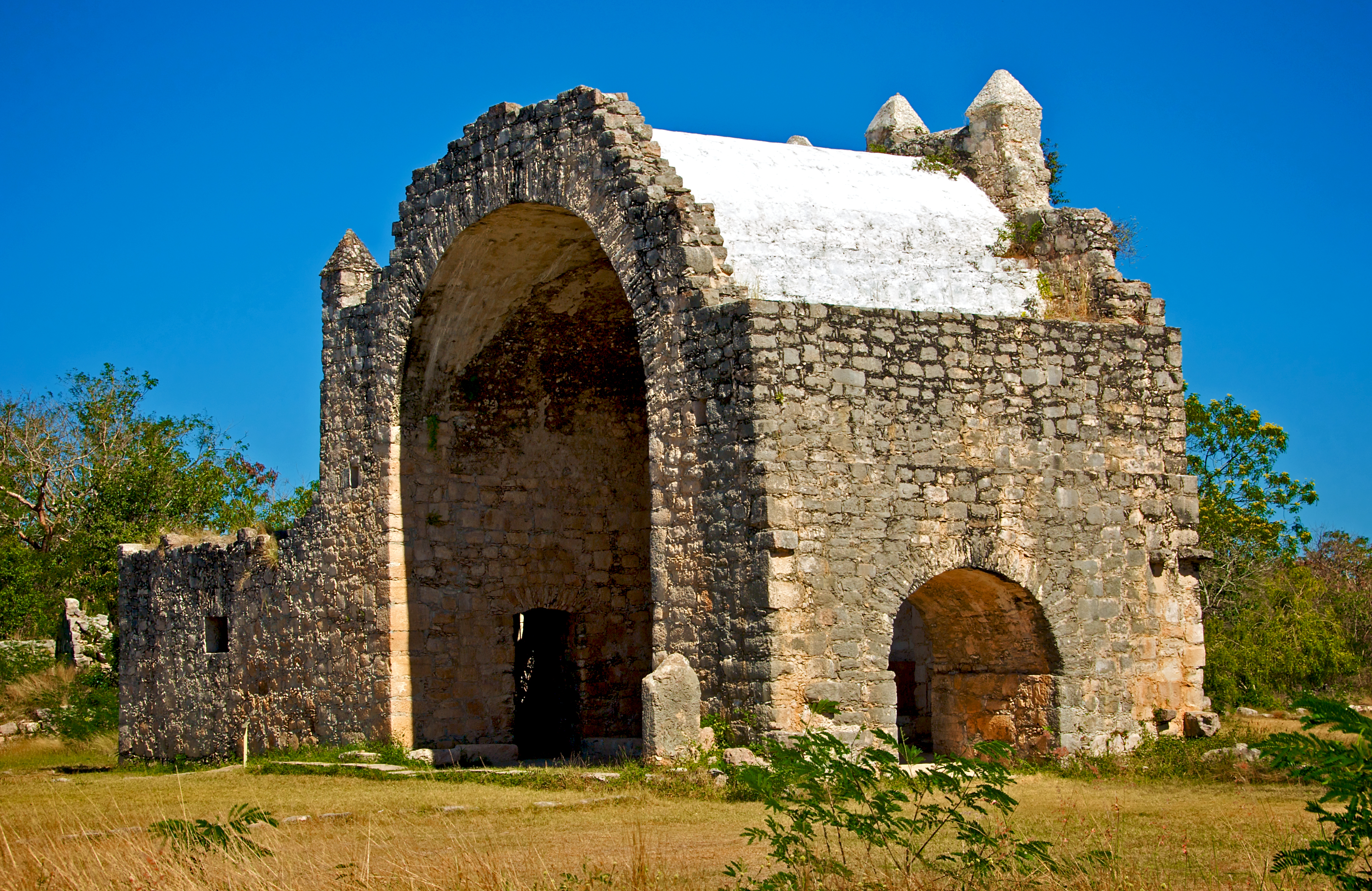
Ruins of the colonial open chapel

Cenote at Dzibilchaltun

Dzibilchaltún (Yucatec Maya: Ts'íibil Cháaltun, [d̥z̥ʼiː˧˥biɭ tɕʰɒːl˦˥tuŋ]) is a Maya archaeological site in the Mexican state of Yucatán, approximately 10 miles (16 km) north of the state capital of Mérida. The original name for the site may have been Ch'iy Chan Ti'Ho.

== Location ==
In the view of modern researchers, the ancient builders of Dzibilchaltún may have chosen the site of the city to be as close as possible to the coastal salt-producing region (about 22 km (13.7 mi) away), while still being located on a reasonably fertile and habitable terrain. The region between Dzibilchaltún and the sea coast is less suitable for human habitation, being either mangrove swamps or bare rock.

== Overview ==
The site has been continuously occupied for thousands of years, although it has expanded into a mid-sized city and contracted back to a small town more than once in its long history. It is about 30 minutes north of Mérida, and about the same distance south of the location of the impact site of the meteorite that killed the dinosaurs in Chicxulub.

While many of the stelae at the site are eroded, the site had at least one king who was memorialized on Stela 10; his name was K'alo'mte' Uk'uuw Chan Chaahk.

== Architecture ==
The most famous structure is the Temple of the Seven Dolls, so named because of seven small effigies found at the site when the temple was discovered under the ruins of a later temple pyramid by archaeologists in the 1950s. On the vernal equinox, the site is crowded by visitors observing the sunrise through the temple's doorways. However, there is no archaeological feature marking the observation spot, making any relationship between the orientation of the temple with the equinoxes highly unlikely. The temple is connected to the rest of the site by a sacbe, or "white road," so-called because they were originally coated with white limestone, built over stone-and-rubble fill.

== Surroundings ==
The other major feature of Dzibilchaltún is its cenote, Cenote Xlakah, located around the center of the city's ruins. It is thought that the availability of this source of clean drinking water influenced the builders' choice of the location. Archaeological findings retrieved from the cenote by divers indicate that it was the center of a religious cult. While traditionally the cenote was used as a swimming hole by local residents and tourists year round, it is currently closed, apparently for maintenance although there is evidence that it is now polluted by waste water from surrounding residential developments.

Similar to Chichen Itza, a large number of archaeological pieces like carved bones and wooden objects, but mainly vases, have been found in the cenote. Valuable information about the ancient Mayans who lived near the cenote was found here.

Dzibilchaltún also contains the ruin of a 16th-century Spanish church built at the site after the conquest.

The Dzibilchaltun archeological site also includes a visitor center with maps, restrooms and gift shops. Backpacks and other similar items are to be left at lockers and are not permitted inside the site. Guides are on hand and can be hired for tours of the site. The renovated museum housing Mayan artifacts located at the site has re-opened. The museum is closed on Mondays.

== National park ==
Dzibilchantún National Park was designated in 1987, and covers an area of 5.39 km^{2}. It is managed by the National Commission of Natural Protected Areas (CONANP).

The natural vegetation of the area is dry forest.

== See also ==
- List of Mesoamerican pyramids
- List of sinkholes of Mexico
