= Capilla abierta =

Mexican chapel construction type

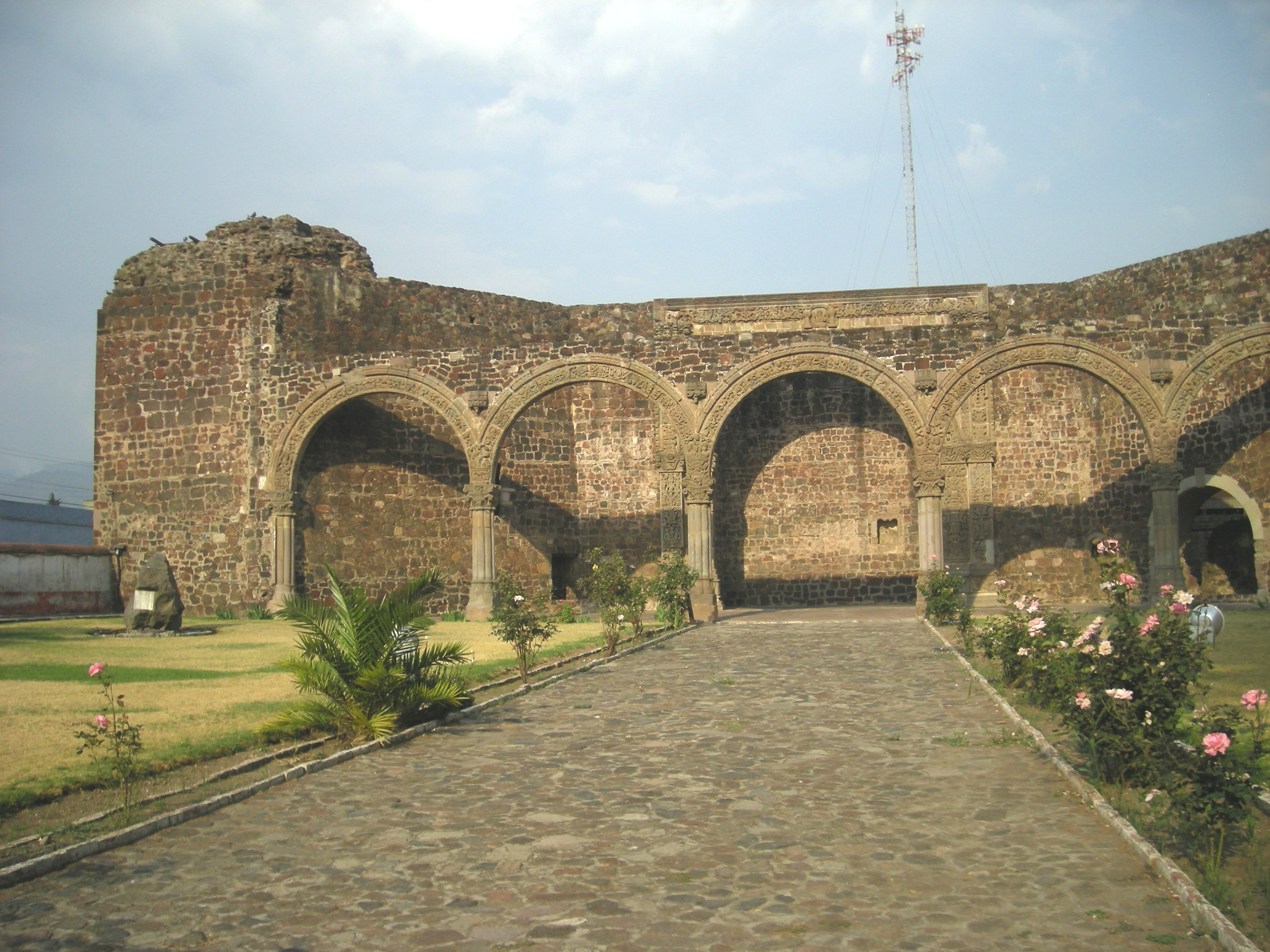
Capilla abierta of Tlalmanalco, Mexico State

A capilla abierta ('open chapel') is considered to be one of the most distinct Mexican construction forms. Mostly built in the 16th century during the early colonial period, the construction was basically an apse or open presbytery containing an altar, which opened onto a large atrium or plaza. While some state that these were constructed by friars because the native peoples of that epoch were afraid to enter the dark confines of European-style churches, the more likely reasons for their construction were that they allowed the holding of Mass for enormous numbers of people and the arrangement held similarities to the teocallis or sacred precincts of pre-Hispanic temples. While open chapels can be found in other places in Spain and Peru, their systematic use in monasteries and other religious complexes, leading to a regularization of architectural elements, is only found in Mexico.

== Structure ==
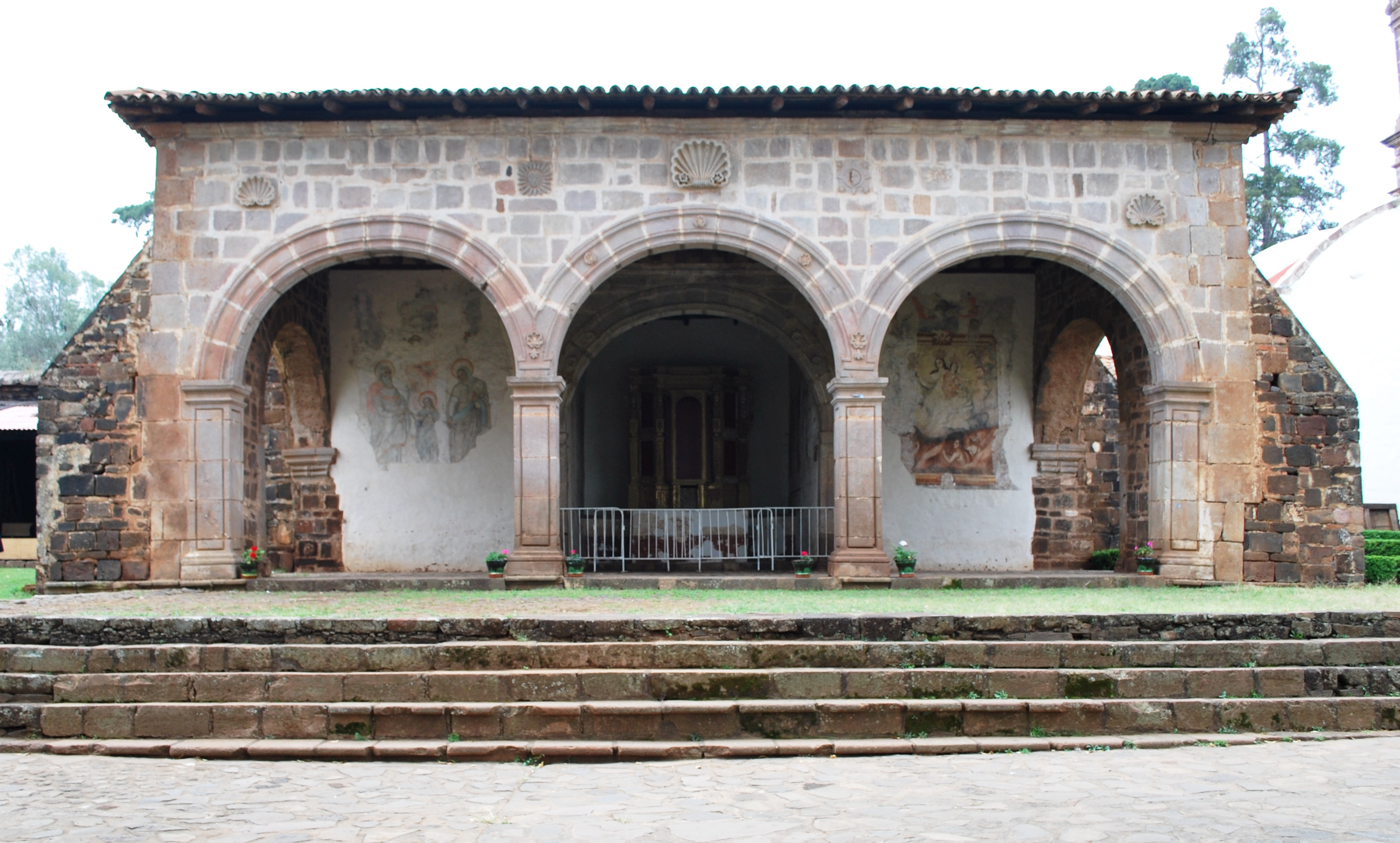
Open chapel of the monastery of San Francisco in Tzintzuntzan, Michoacán.

The capilla abierta was an open apse or presbytery of a reduced size, located on the ground floor or the first floor (which allowed for greater visibility) and opening onto a large atrium or plaza. The main idea is to allow the large number of people to congregate in front of a single altar. In Mexico, three types of open chapels came to be used: the "salon" or "mosque" type found in Cholula and Puebla, distinguished by its front arcade with Moorish arches; the "portico" type which was a porch area in front of the cloister; and the "balcony" type, located on the upper floor or roof. Portico style chapels can be seen in Tlalmanalco, Atlatlahucan and Cempoala, with the best known of the balcony type being found in Acolman, Mexico State.

Almost all open chapels were part of a larger structure, whether it was the main church or the cloister of the monastery. One significant exception is the chapel in Actopan, Hidalgo.

The most important feature of the open chapels was to allow the largest number of people possible to congregate in front of a single altar and have that altar visible to all. This is one reason why all capilla abiertas were built facing a large atrium or other open area. One of the most obvious features for visibility was to have the chapel located on an upper floor, such as the one located in Tlahueilpa. However, other architectural designs appear with this goal in mind. In San Juan Teposcolula, the buttresses holding up the roof were placed so that they did not block the view from any point in the atrium.

In some cases, the open chapel inspired designs for covered churches. The cathedral for Pátzcuaro was conceived of by Vasco de Quiroga as a center for the main altar with five naves surrounding it, so that anyone sitting anywhere in any nave could see the altar without problems. In reality, it would be five churches facing a single altar. However, only one nave was ever built. Another interesting church design with visibility in mind is the Royal Chapel of San Gabriel de Cholula. The chapel has a square floor plan with seven naves with seven sections each, separated by octagonal pillars. The inspiration for this design is the Islamic mosque. This design was also used at the Church of San Francisco de los Naturales in San Francisco de Mexico, which has since been destroyed. This same need may have also been the reason behind the later construction of single-nave churches with no side chapels later in the colonial period.

== Purpose ==
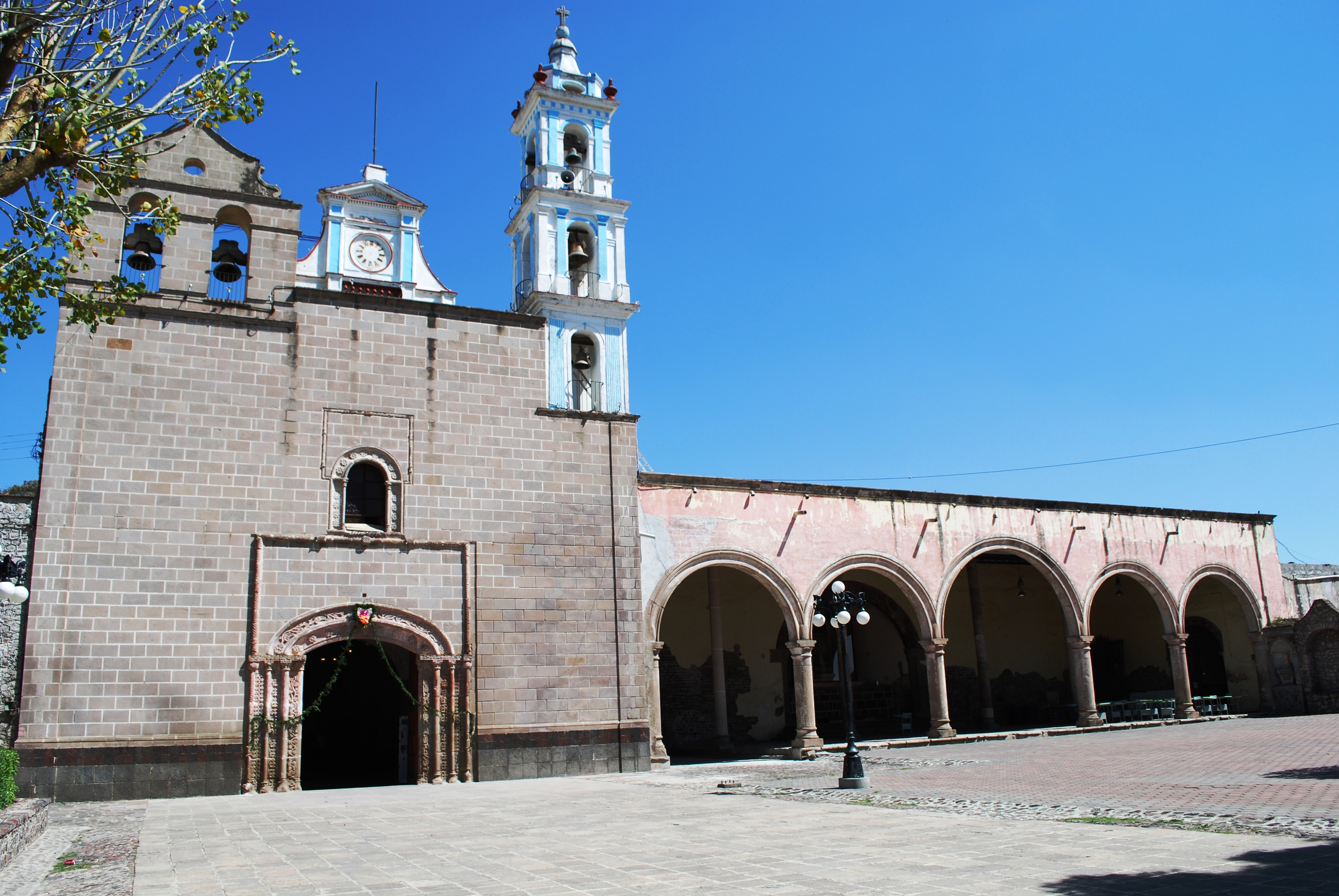
Church of the Purisima Concepcion with open chapel in Otumba de Gómez Farías.

The open chapel was predominantly used during the very early colonial period (16th century) in central Mexico, then called New Spain. Several examples appear in Cuzco, Peru, at the churches of Santo Domingo, La Merced and San Jeronimo, but their systematic appearance and regularization of appearance appears only in Mexico.

Some sources state that the capilla abiertas were constructed because the native populations in the 16th century were too afraid to enter the dark confines of European style churches. However, a number of these chapels predate their traditional church counterparts, sometimes by decades or more. The most likely reason for their construction was that in the early colonial period, there was an enormous number of indigenous people and few friars and priests to evangelize and say Mass. The need for these chapels is mentioned by Toribio de Benavente who writes that they are needed along with large atriums to hold numbers of people who could not fit inside the church on Sundays and during festivals. During the slow times, such as mid-week, the main church was used. Another advantage the open chapel/atrium arrangement afforded was that it had similarities to the old teocallis, or sacred precincts of pre-Hispanic temples.

The idea of an open chapel to serve multitudes was not completely new, as there are precedents on the Iberian Peninsula. Chapels with altars were constructed in loggias in Spain so that on feast and market days all could attend Mass. What was new was its systematic use leading to a type of regularized architecture for this type of construction and its integration into monasteries and other religious complexes.

The chapels represent one of the first steps of the cultural integration after the Spanish Conquest. As the seat of his dominions, Hernán Cortés chose Cuernavaca. Immediately he initiated the construction of a palace over an old tribute collection center and nearby the construction of a church with an open chapel. The open chapel of San Jose is located next to the Cuernavaca Cathedral. This chapel originally was much bigger than what remains today. The open chapel here was used not only for Mass but also for plays, music, dance and other events designed to explain and reinforce the faith.

== Examples of open chapels ==
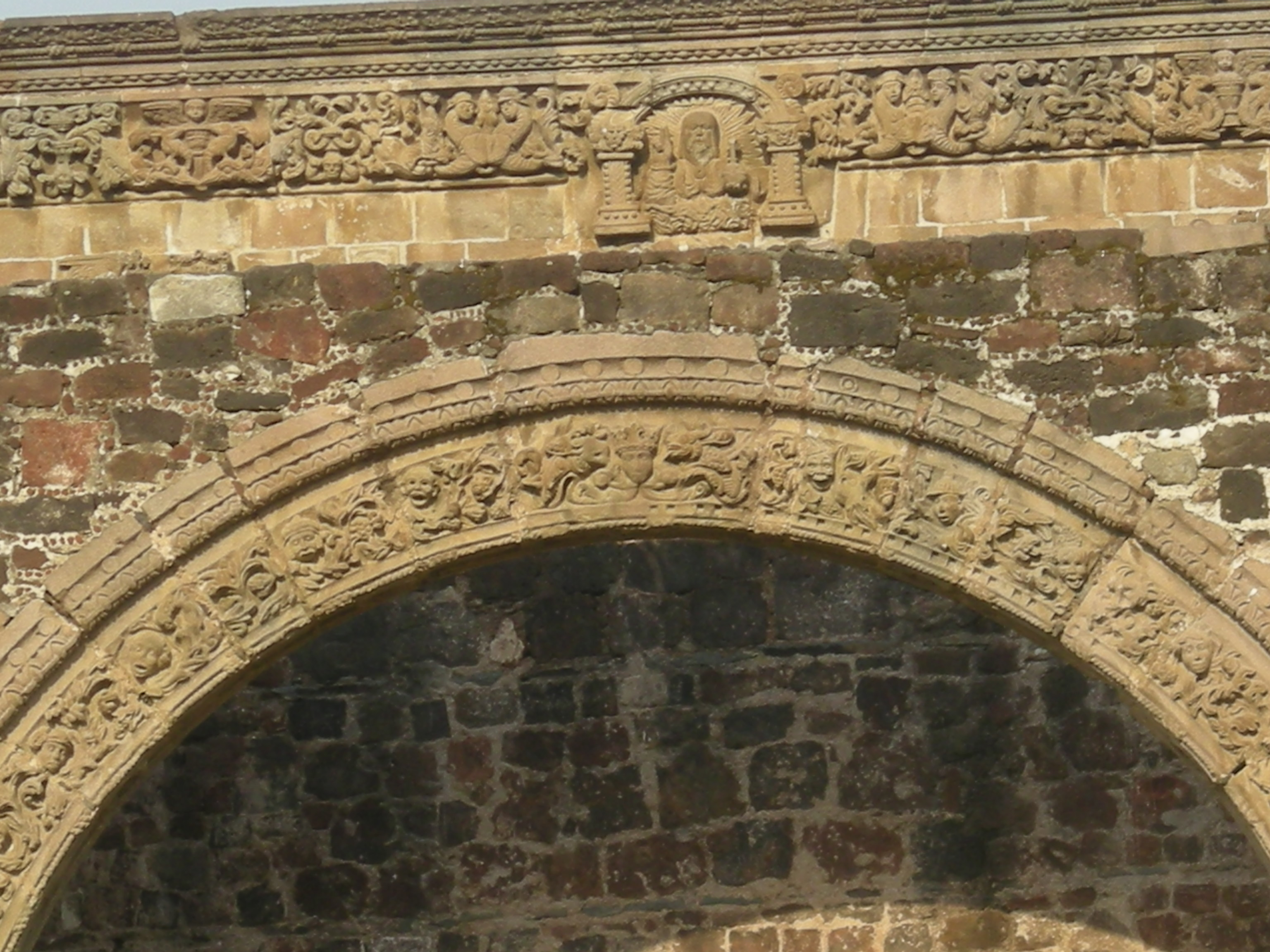
Arch with decorative details from the Tlalmanalco chapel

The open chapel is considered to be one of the most unusual construction types from Mexico in world architecture. Most open chapels were built in what are now the central highlands of Mexico in states such as the State of Mexico, Puebla and Tlaxcala; however, some examples can be found in areas as far south as the Yucatan Peninsula.

The capilla abierta of Tlalmanalco was constructed by the Franciscans between 1585 and 1591. This chapel was never finished, but is primarily Plateresque with Romance and Gothic elements. It also presents indigenous elements in the decoration, which was done by native craftsmen. The images in the decoration depict the battle between good and evil, represented by monkeys, lions, angels and cherubs. There are also faces of the devil with horns. The chapel was declared a colonial monument in 1936.

The capilla abierta of Coixtlahuaca is adjacent to the Church of San Juan Bautista, in San Juan Bautista Coixtlahuaca, Oaxaca. It is square with a trapezoid apse covered by a ribbed vault. To the right of the chapel is a kind of a sacristy with had a flat, wood-bean roof, since disappeared. On that roof was a choir with views of the open chapel from its balcony. Some of the decorative work included friezes of dragon heads and pelicans. This chapel was formally called the “Chapel of the Indians” and believed to have been built before the main church. Today it lies in ruins and has not been restored.

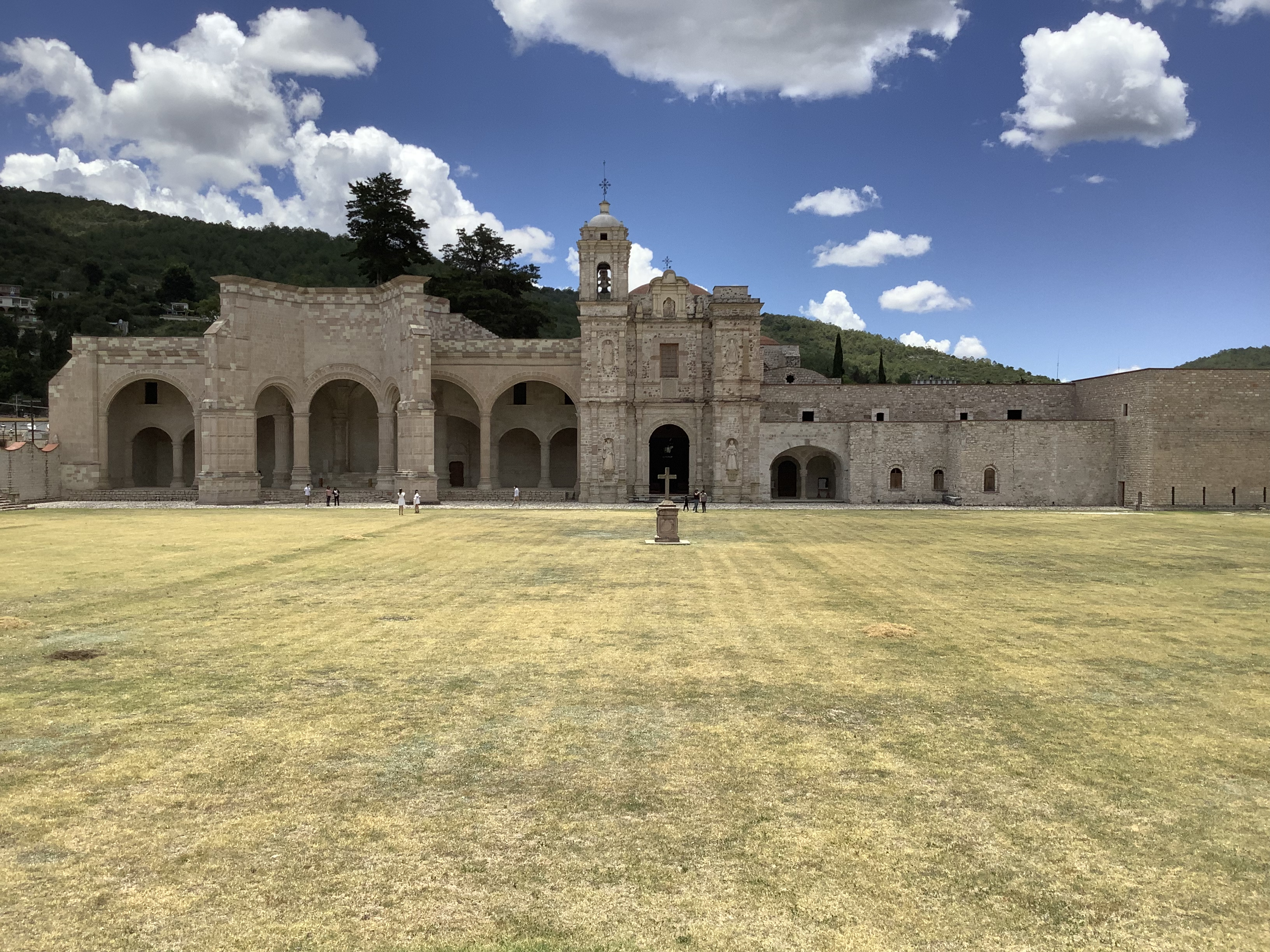
Former Dominican convent with its open chapel in San Pedro y San Pablo Teposcolula, Oaxaca.

The capilla abierta of Teposcolula, one of the biggest open chapels, is a variant of the portico type but slightly more complicated. It is formed by two naves covered by wood which separate an arcade with five arches. The outer nave is open to the atrium. In the center, was the space for the altar covered by an octagonal groin vault. It is similar to a multi-naved church.

In Tizatlan, Tlaxcala, the capilla abierta was constructed very similarly to the pre-Hispanic altars with paintings. The main church was not built until the 17th century and the open chapel was incorporated as the apse. The former monastery of Nuestra Señora de la Asuncion, now the Cathedral of Tlaxcala has two atriums. The more elevated one has a belltower with an open chapel in which one of the first plays in Nahuatl directed by the friars was performed.

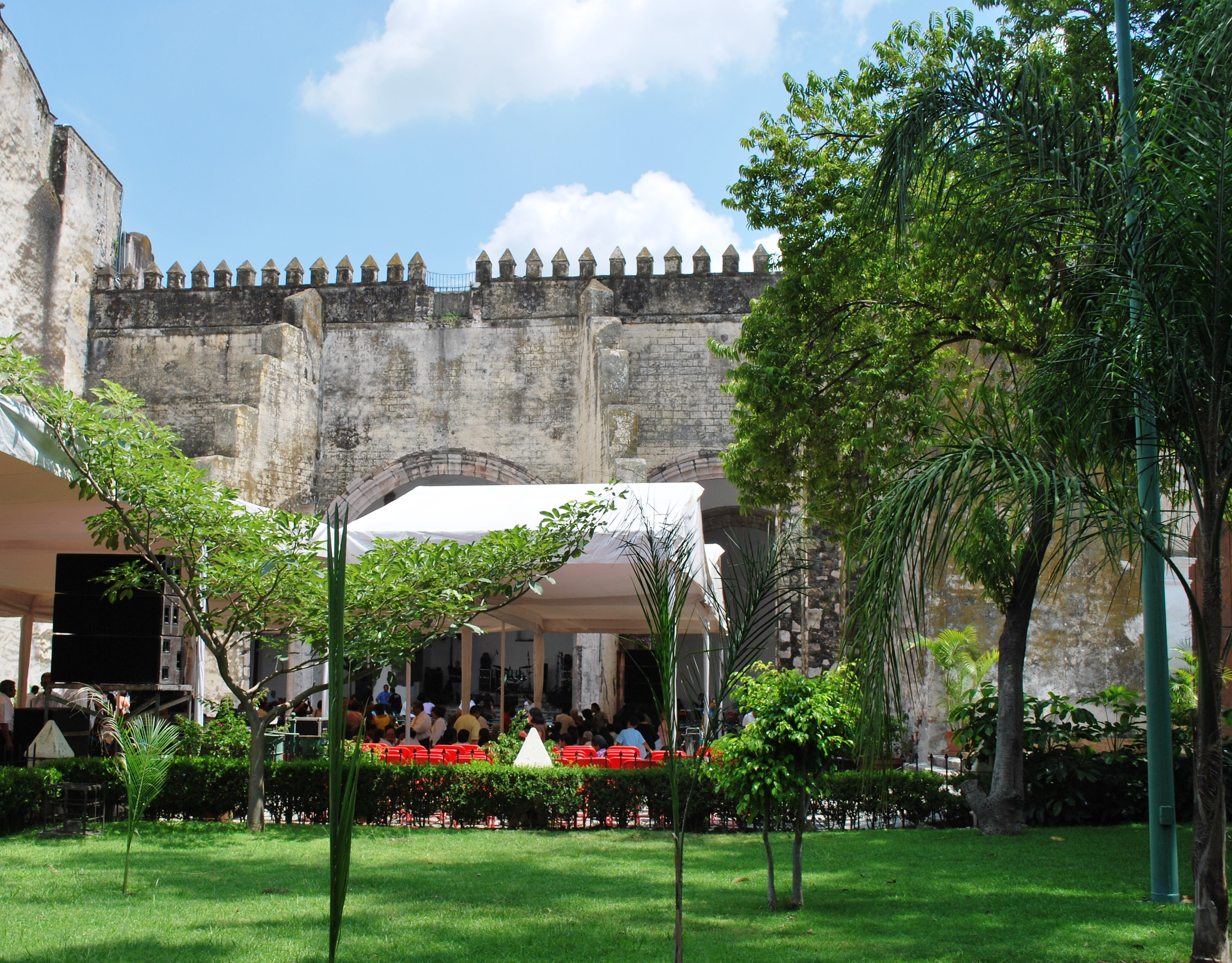
Open chapel of the Cathedral of Cuernavaca being used as a concert venue

One of the most-visited historic monuments in the State of Mexico is the open chapel of Calimaya. This chapel was constructed in 1529 by the Franciscans for evangelization purposes. The construction has three main parts: the chapel with six arches, the apse with an altar from the 16th century, and the baptistery. The altar is referred to as the “Señor del Cuerito” for the oil painting of Christ to which has been attributed a significant number of miracles. This is one of the first evangelization centers in Mexico.

In the Yucatan Peninsula, two examples of capilla abiertas can be found in the former Mayan cities of Dzibilchaltun and Oxtancah. Dzibilchaltun is located near Mérida and has a pyramid known as the Temple of the Seven Dolls (Templo de las Siete Muñecas) which is located near a natural water well. Between this well and the pyramid was constructed an open chapel, breaking the trajectory between the pyramid and the once-sacred well. Oxtancah is located near Chetumal. Here conquistador Alonso de Avila constructed an open chapel over one of the Mayan temples. One of the walls contains the images of three Spanish style ships from that era. Due to strong native resistance, this early Spanish settlement only lasted a few years, but the chapel remains.
